= HMLA-167 =

US Marine Corps unit

Marine Light Attack Helicopter Squadron 167
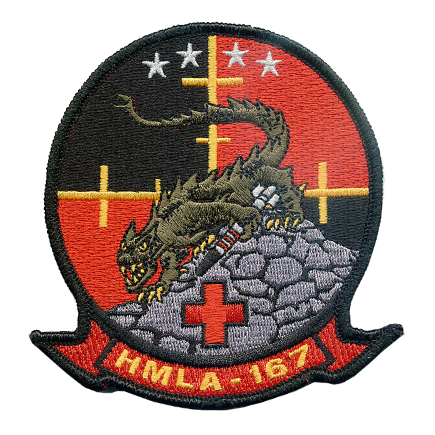
- HMLA-167 squadron patch
- Active: 15 March 1968 – present
- Country: United States
- Branch: United States Marine Corps
- Type: Light Attack Helicopter Squadron
- Role: Close Air Support; Air interdiction Assault Support
- Part of: Marine Aircraft Group 29; 2nd Marine Aircraft Wing
- Garrison/HQ: Marine Corps Air Station New River
- Nickname: "Warriors"
- Motto: Have Guns-Will Travel
- Tail Code: TV
- Engagements: Vietnam War; Operation Praying Mantis; Operation Desert Storm; Operation Provide Comfort; Operation Provide Promise; Operation Southern Watch; Operation Deny Flight; Operation Joint Endeavor; Operation Silver Wake; Operation Iraqi Freedom * Operation Vigilant Resolve; Operation Enduring Freedom

Commanders
- Commanding Officer: LtCol Corey S. "Diablo" Healey

Aircraft flown
- Attack helicopter: AH-1T/W Sea Cobra/Super Cobra (1984–2020); AH-1Z Viper (2018–)
- Utility helicopter: UH-1E Iroquois (1968–1972); Bell UH-1N Twin Huey (1972–2012); UH-1Y Venom (2012–present)

Marine Light Attack Helicopter Squadron 167 (HMLA-167) is a United States Marine Corps helicopter squadron consisting of Bell AH-1Z Viper attack helicopters and UH-1Y Venom utility helicopters. Known as the "Warriors", they are based at Marine Corps Air Station New River, North Carolina and fall under the command of Marine Aircraft Group 29 (MAG-29) and the 2nd Marine Aircraft Wing (2nd MAW).

== Mission ==
Support the Marine Air-Ground Task Force commander by providing offensive air support, utility support, armed escort and airborne supporting arms coordination, day or night under all weather conditions during expeditionary, joint or combined operations.

== History ==
=== Vietnam War ===
Marine Light Helicopter Squadron 167 was commissioned on 15 March 1968, at Marble Mountain Air Facility, Republic of Vietnam. From commissioning date until June 1971, HML-167 would participate in operations against communist forces in the Republic of Vietnam. Flying UH-1Es for the duration of its tenure in Vietnam. On 21 June 1969, HML-167 dropped the first helicopter bomb. This was accomplished using the Helicopter Trap Weapon (HTW).

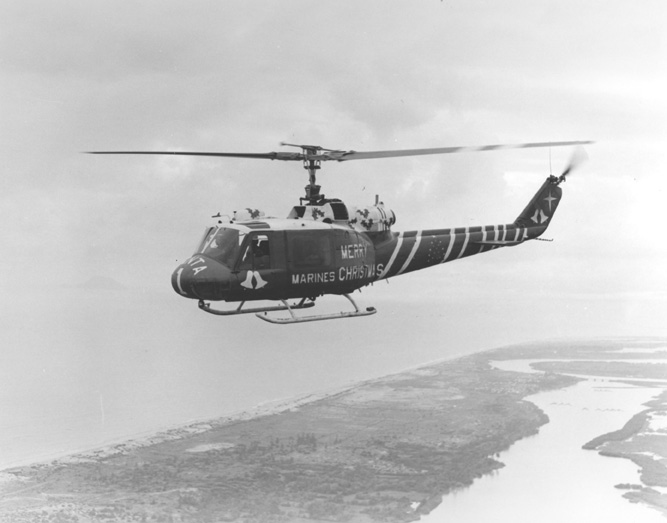
An HML-167 UH-1E over Marble Mountain, Christmas 1970.

In May 1971, HML-167 was the last operating Marine helicopter squadron in the Republic of Vietnam. On 26 May 1971, the squadron held its official stand down, concluding over 60,000 combat flight hours. On 19 June 1971, HML-167 was transferred to MCAS New River, Jacksonville, North Carolina and became a part of Marine Aircraft Group 26, 2nd Marine Aircraft Wing.

=== 1970s & 1980s ===
In April 1972, HML-167 received the Marine Corps’ first UH-1N. HML-167 acquired the additional responsibilities as training squadron and model manager for the UH-1N. On 16 May 1972, HML-167 was transferred to Marine Aircraft Group 29. The squadron performed the first coast to coast UH-1N flight in 1973.

From 11 to 22 August 1980 personnel and equipment from the squadron deployed throughout Haiti to provide disaster relief after the effects of Hurricane Allen. When Hurricane David and Hurricane Frederic hit the Dominican Republic, HML-167 was on the scene to provide disaster relief from 1 to 17 September 1980.

In 1982, HML-167 was reorganized and transferred back to MAG-26 at the same Air Station. This was evident by HML-167's role in the peacekeeping force in Lebanon from October 1982 through November 1983. In October 1983, HML-167 achieved ten years of mishap free flying, accumulating approximately 65,000 flight hours. Through the years HML-167 was awarded the following: CNO Aviation Safety Award (1972,76, 78, 81, 92, 93), FMFLANT Aviation Award (1975, 83), National Defense Transportation Award 1981, and Commandant of the Marine Corps Certificate of Commendation 1981.

HML-167 received its first AH-1T Cobras on 17 January 1984, and became HMLA-167 on 1 April 1986. It was the first unit to be officially designated as a Light Attack Squadron with a permanent composite mix of UH-1N and AH-1T Helicopters.

Throughout 1986 and 1987, HMLA-167 demonstrated its flexibility. HMLA-167's main body deployed as the Aviation Combat Element (ACE) for contingency MAGTF 2–88 in the Persian Gulf participating in Operation Praying Mantis. MAGTF 2–88 conducted an assault on the Sassan Gas/Oil separation platform complex in response to the Iranian mine attack on the USS Samuel B. Roberts. HMLA-167 also escorted eleven "Earnest Will" oil tanker convoys as well as ten minesweeper transits during its deployment in the Persian Gulf. As 1989 came to a close, HMLA-167 took delivery of its first three AH-1W Super Cobras during a ceremony at the National Helicopter Association's annual convention.

=== The Gulf War & the 1990s ===
Beginning in June 1990, detachments from HMLA-167 supported 22nd Marine Expeditionary Unit during the largest Noncombatant Evacuation Operation (NEO) since the evacuation of Saigon with the evacuation of over 3,000 American citizens and foreign nationals from the embattled capital in Monrovia, Liberia.

In August, HMLA-167 was recalled for deployment in support of Operation Desert Shield. Six AH-1Ws and sixteen pilots were detached to MAG-29 and subsequently deployed to Saudi Arabia later that month and would remain in theater through the completion of Operation Desert Storm. Separate detachments from HMLA-167 would also participate in Operation Provide Comfort and Operation Encourage Hope in eastern Turkey and northern Iraq during the spring and summer months of 1991.

Detachments from the squadron would eventually begin participating in operation Operation Provide Promise in the Adriatic Sea during the Balkans crisis. A special purpose MAGTF, formed with a detachment of UH-1Ns, embarked aboard the aircraft carrier USS Theodore Roosevelt in response to the continuing crisis in the Balkans. They also supported Operation Southern Watch in the Red Sea during renewed tensions with Iraq. This deployment marked the first time Marine ground and helicopter assets were embarked aboard an aircraft carrier.

In October 1993, HMLA-167 was activated in support of Operation Support Democracy in expectation of contingency operations in Haiti. This operation was the first time Warrior aircraft executed an immediate embarkation aboard amphibious transport. Support for operations in the Caribbean Sea continued into 1994 while HMLA-167 was tasked to support counter drug operations within the United States. HMLA-167 won the CNO's Safety Award for 1992 and 1993.

1994 saw squadron detachments support Operation Deny Flight off of Bosnia and assisted in the withdrawal of United States forces from Somalia.

On 28 February 1995, the squadron became the first HMLA on the East Coast to receive an AH-1W Super Cobra with the Night Targeting System. This FLIR and Laser designator was a giant leap in technology and capability for the Warriors.

From 1995–2001, the Warriors supported all MAG-26 designated Marine Expeditionary Unit deployments. These detachments supported numerous contingency operations to include: Operation Joint Endeavor in Bosnia, Operation Silver Wake in Albania and Operation Guardian Retrieval and Operation Noble Obelisk in Africa. The Squadron also sourced one 2 plane UH-1N detachment to Special Purpose MAGTF-8 in support of Operation Assured Response/Quick Response in Liberia, Africa. The Special Purpose MAGTF Huey detachment also conducted the medical evacuation of numerous civilians from the Merchant Vessel Borren Mill after it caught fire and was rendered unseaworthy 100 miles (160 km) off the West Coast of Africa. In the fall of 1998, Special purpose MAGTF/JTF Full Provider supported humanitarian relief operations in Puerto Rico, Dominican Republic and Haiti with two Warrior UH-1Ns after Hurricane Georges ripped through the Caribbean.

=== The Global War on Terror ===
In 2003, HMLA-167 supported Marine Aircraft Group 29 by providing 9 aircraft and 17 personnel to HMLA-269 in support of Operation Iraqi Freedom.

In February 2004 HMLA-167 again deployed in support of Operation Iraqi Freedom. The squadron deployed 18 AH-1Ws, 9 UH-1Ns, and a small detachment of Marines in January aboard the USS Bataan. On the 22 February, all 27 aircraft made the transit from Kuwait to Al Asad, Iraq. This was the home of HMLA-167 for the next six months. During Operation Vigilant Resolve in Fallujah in April 2004, HMLA-167 sent a detachment to help with surge operations from Al Taqaddum. The Warriors also operated from three forward operating bases (FOBs), FOB Al Qaim, FOB Korean Village and FOB Kalsu.

At the same time the Warriors were in Iraq, HMLA-167 had a detachment with the 22nd MEU operating out of Afghanistan. As the Air Combat Element for the MEU, they operated out of Kandahar International Airport, outside of Khandahar, Afghanistan and flew in support of Marine, Army, Special Forces, and Afghan National Army operations in southwestern Afghanistan.

On 24 August 2004 the Warriors returned to MCAS New River. They fell back under the command of MAG-26. Having left their aircraft in Iraq for follow on units, the Warriors began to reassemble their squadron. The first aircraft delivered to 167 were former Unit Deployment Program (UDP) aircraft from Okinawa. These were dropped off by a Russian transport aircraft to MCAS Cherry Point. HMLA-167 would eventually accept and transfer over 111 aircraft during the next year.

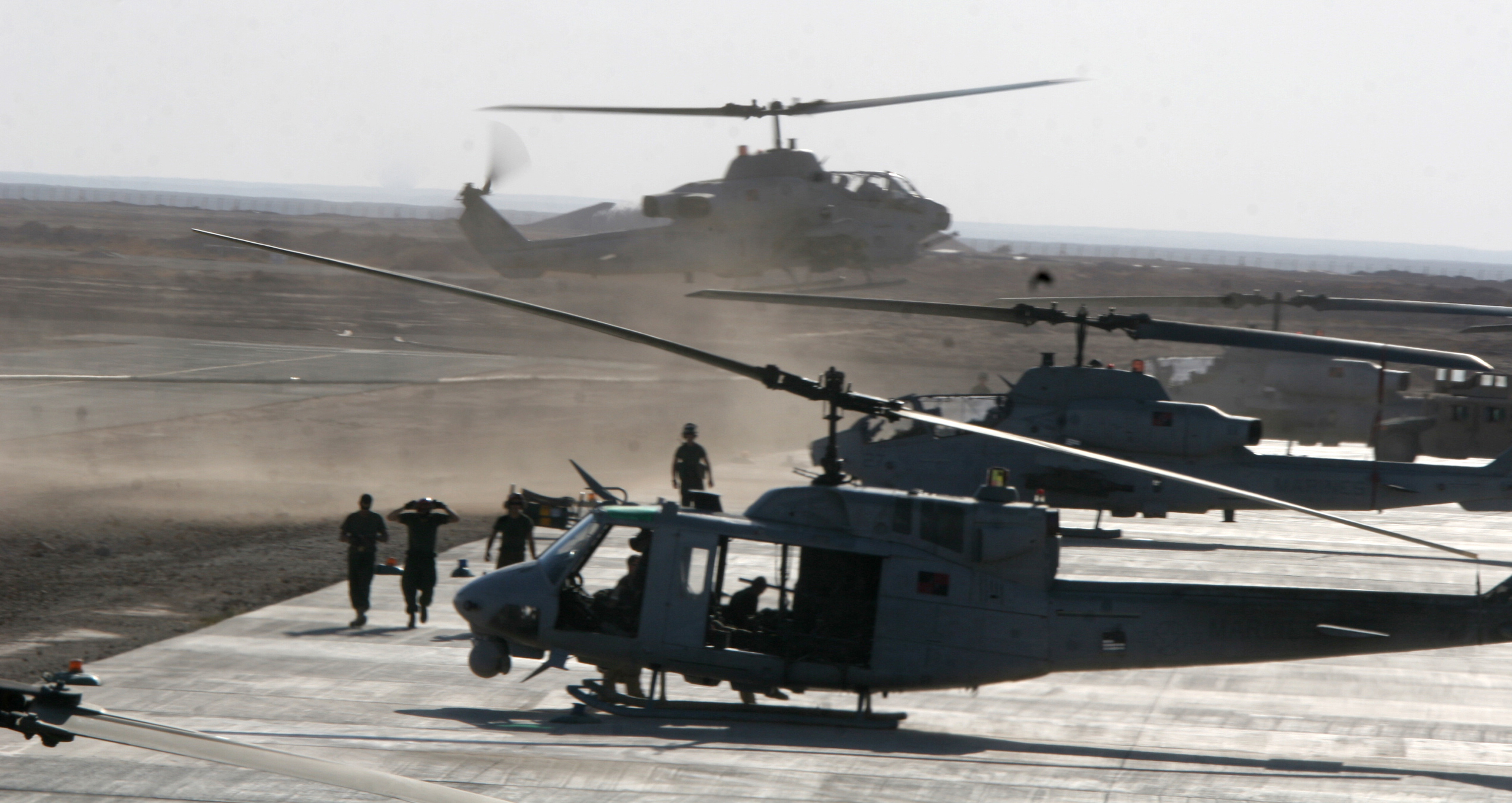
HMLA-167 AH-1Ws and an UH-1N at Al Asad, Iraq, in 2008.

On 7 August 2005 HMLA-167 departed MCAS New River and rejoined MAG-26 in Al Asad, Iraq. This trip to Iraq would be the third in less than three years for many of the Marines. HMLA-167 redeployed to MCAS New River on 1 March 2006. During this same period, HMLA-167 had a detachment with the 22nd Marine Expeditionary Unit that operated out of Al Asad during its 6-month deployment.

In August 2006, HMLA-167 departed MCAS New River after only 5 months at home to join MAG-16 in Al Asad, Iraq. HMLA-167 redeployed to MCAS New River in March 2007. The squadron has again deployed in support of Operation Iraqi Freedom leaving MCAS New River on 11 March 2008 for a seven-month tour in Iraq. After only a few months home, HMLA-167 split into two detachments, the main body deploying to Iraq and a small four AH-1W cobra detachment deploying to Afghanistan on 8 February 2009. The squadron would also provide a 4 AH-1W and 2 UH-1N detachment for the 22nd MEU with VMM-263 (REIN) for the first MV-22 MEU from October 2008 to December 2009.

In March 2011 during the Libya civil war HMLA 167 sent a detachment of UH-1N Hueys and AH-1W Cobras in support of the 22nd MEU, for an 11-month deployment.

On 3 May 2013 HMLA 167 returned to middle east in support of Operation Enduring Freedom by being deployed to Camp Bastion Afghanistan, as well as supporting combat operations at COP Camp Dwyer and COP Shukvani in Afghanistan's' Helmand Province. It was also the first time HMLA 167 deployed with the UH-1Y "Yankee". In June 2013 HMLA 167 sent a detachment of four AH-1W cobras to Okinawa to help kick start the UDP deployment cycle again. In November 2013 and December 2013 both the Marines of OEF and UDP returned from their deployments respectively.

In October 2015 a detachment of AH-1W's and UH-1Y's from HMLA-167 joined VMM-162(REIN) of the 26th MEU in a deployment to the 5th and 6th Fleet areas of operation. Also in November 2015 HMLA-167 departed MCAS New River and moved to Okinawa, Japan to take part in UDP 16.1 completing training exercises in Thailand for Cobra Gold 2016 and the Philippines for Balaktan 2016. The Marines on the 26th MEU returned home in April 2016, and the Marines in Okinawa returned in May 2016. In July 2016, as well as July 2018, HMLA-167 received the Chief of Naval Operations Safety Award.

In May 2019 a detachment of 4 AH-1Ws and 3 UH-1Ys from HMLA 167 joined VMM-365 (REIN) and the 26th MEU. The detachment would deploy in December 2019 to the 6th and 5th Fleet Area of Responsibility in response to increased tensions with Iran. This would be the last deployment for the AH-1W, under the callsign BUZZSAW, as the squadron completed their AH-1Z transition in 2020.

== Unit awards ==
A unit citation or commendation is an award bestowed upon an organization for the action cited. Members of the unit who participated in said actions are allowed to wear on their uniforms the awarded unit citation. HMLA-167 has been presented with the following awards:

Ribbon	Unit Award
	Joint Meritorious Unit Award
	Navy Unit Commendation with two Bronze Stars
	Meritorious Unit Commendation with two Bronze Stars
	National Defense Service Medal with two Bronze Stars
	Vietnam Service Medal with one Silver Star and two Bronze Stars
	Vietnam Cross of Gallantry with Palm Streamer
	Vietnam Meritorious Unit Citation Civil Action Medal
	Afghanistan Campaign Medal
	Iraq Campaign Medal
	Global War on Terrorism Expeditionary Medal
	Global War on Terrorism Service Medal

== See also ==
- List of active United States Marine Corps aircraft squadrons
- United States Marine Corps Aviation
