= HMH-461 =

Marine Heavy Helicopter Squadron 461
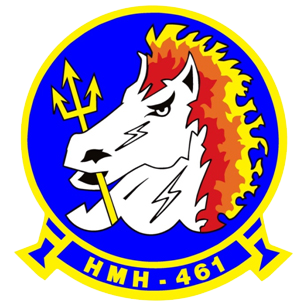
- HMH-461 Unit insignia
- Active: 15 March 1944 - September 1950; January 1957 - present
- Country: United States of America
- Branch: United States Marine Corps
- Type: Marine Heavy Helicopter Squadron
- Role: Assault support
- Part of: Marine Aircraft Group 29; 2nd Marine Aircraft Wing
- Garrison/HQ: Marine Corps Air Station New River
- Nicknames: "Ironhorse" "Red Raider" (World War II)
- Mottos: "Mission First, People Always."
- Tail code: CJ
- Engagements: Persian Gulf War: Operation Desert Storm; Operation Enduring Freedom

Commanders
- Commanding Officer: Lieutenant Colonel Zachary S. Allen
- Executive Officer: Major Whitley C. Noel

Aircraft flown
- Fighter: F4U Corsair (1944-50)
- Cargo helicopter: CH-37C Mojave (1957-66); CH-53A/D Sea Stallion (1966-88); CH-53E Super Stallion (1988-2021); CH-53K King Stallion (2022-present)

Marine Heavy Helicopter Squadron 461 (HMH-461) is a United States Marine Corps helicopter squadron consisting of CH-53K King Stallion transport helicopters. The squadron, known as "Ironhorse", is based at Marine Corps Air Station New River in North Carolina and falls under the command of Marine Aircraft Group 29 (MAG-29) and the 2nd Marine Aircraft Wing (2nd MAW). With its lineage starting in 1944, HMH-461 is the oldest active Heavy Lift Helicopter Squadron in the Marine Corps.

== Mission ==
Support the MAGTF Commander by providing assault support transport of heavy equipment, combat troops, and supplies, day or night under all weather conditions during expeditionary, joint, or combined operations.

== History ==
=== Early years ===
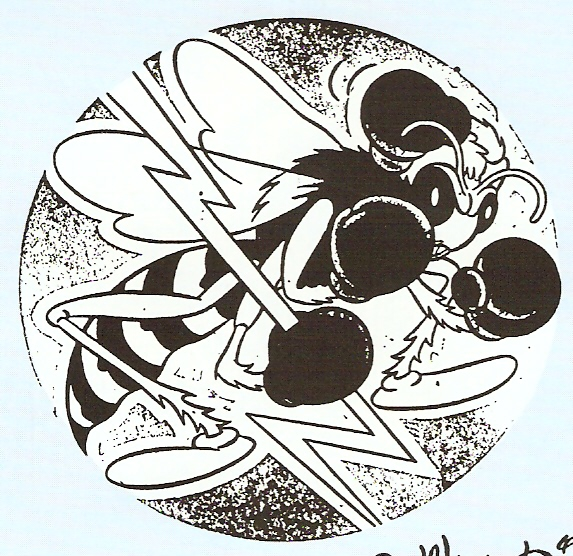
Squadron logo designed by Walt Disney during World War II that was never used.

Marine Fighting Squadron 461 (VMF-461) was commissioned on 15 March 1944, at Marine Corps Air Station El Centro in California, as part of Marine Base Defense Group 43. The newly formed squadron flew the Vought F4U Corsair and its callsign was "Red Raider" with a squadron insignia depicting a red bearded Viking. In January 1945, the squadron was relocated to Marine Corps Air Station El Toro, assigned to Marine Aircraft Group 46 (MAG 46), and designated as a replacement training squadron for the remainder of the war.

On 25 February 1946, VMF-461 sailed on board the USS Palau (CVE-122) during her initial shakedown cruise and on 16 March 1946, the squadron departed Naval Base San Diego headed for the east coast of the United States. Arriving at Naval Station Norfolk on 16 March 1946, VMF-461 flew south to MCAS Cherry Point, NC for temporary duty with Marine Aircraft Group 11 (MAG-11). From May to August 1947 the squadron again sailed on the USS Palau, visiting Guantánamo Bay, Monrovia, Liberia, Recife, Brazil, and Dakar, French West Africa. From February to March 1948 VMF-461 took part in Fleet Exercises, this time operating from Roosevelt Roads Naval Station. The squadron again boarded the USS Palau in August 1948 for a three-week cruise to Guantánamo Bay and in November 1948 took part in arctic exercises. The squadron boarded the USS Midway (CV-41) in January 1949 for a two-month Mediterranean cruise and took part in multiple shorter cruises between March and June 1949 on board the USS Midway and the USS Franklin D. Roosevelt. On 1 July 1949, VMF-461 was assigned to MAG-11 at MCAS Cherry Point. From September 1949 until January 1950, the squadron deployed on a Mediterranean cruise as part of MAG-11 on board the USS Leyte (CV-32). In September 1950, VMF-461 was decommissioned.

In January 1957, the squadron was reactivated at Marine Corps Air Station New River in North Carolina as Marine Helicopter Transport Squadron (Medium) 461, HMR(M)-461, assigned to Marine Aircraft Group 26. The squadron was equipped as the initial squadron with the HR2S-1 (later to be designated as the CH-37), then the newest and largest helicopter in the Marine Corps inventory. The "Deuce," as it was called, was capable of carrying 26 troops, or 8,000 pounds of cargo at speeds up to 110 knots. The aircraft was powered by two R2800-54 engines and carried a crew of four. As part of the U.S. space program in 1961, HMR(M)-461 performed aerial recovery of NASA rockets launched at Wallops Island. In February 1962, HMR(M)-461 was redesignated Marine Heavy Helicopter Squadron-461 (HMH-461).

While deployed aboard USS Boxer and USS Guadalcanal from 1962 to 1965, HMH-461 participated in various deployments and exercises in the Mediterranean and Caribbean Seas. In February 1966, the squadron was reduced to cadre status to await arrival of the CH-53A helicopter, which replaced the CH-37. In November 1970, the CH-53A was replaced by the CH-53D helicopter. Throughout the 1970s, HMH-461 continued its support of Fleet Marine operations in such places as the Mediterranean and Caribbean Seas, Scandinavia, Northern Europe and Great Britain.

October 1983 to May 1984 a detachment of four CH-53Ds, from HMH-461, were assigned to HMM-261 for a 6 month Mediterranean deployment aboard the USS Guam (LPH-9). Shortly after departing Norfolk the 22nd MAU was redirected to the Caribbean nation of Grenada and participated in Operation Urgent Fury before relieving the 24th MAU in Beirut Lebanon.

New CH-53E Super Stallion helicopters marked another chapter in HMH-461 history with the first operational flight in October 1987. In September 1988, HMH-461 took delivery of its first lot of eleven CH-53Es from Sikorsky Aircraft and would go on to make history as the first Marine Corps aviation unit to aerial refuel using night vision goggles, externally lift a Riverine Assault Craft, load a CH-53E into a C-17 Globemaster, and lift two HMMWVs simultaneously..

=== The 1990s ===
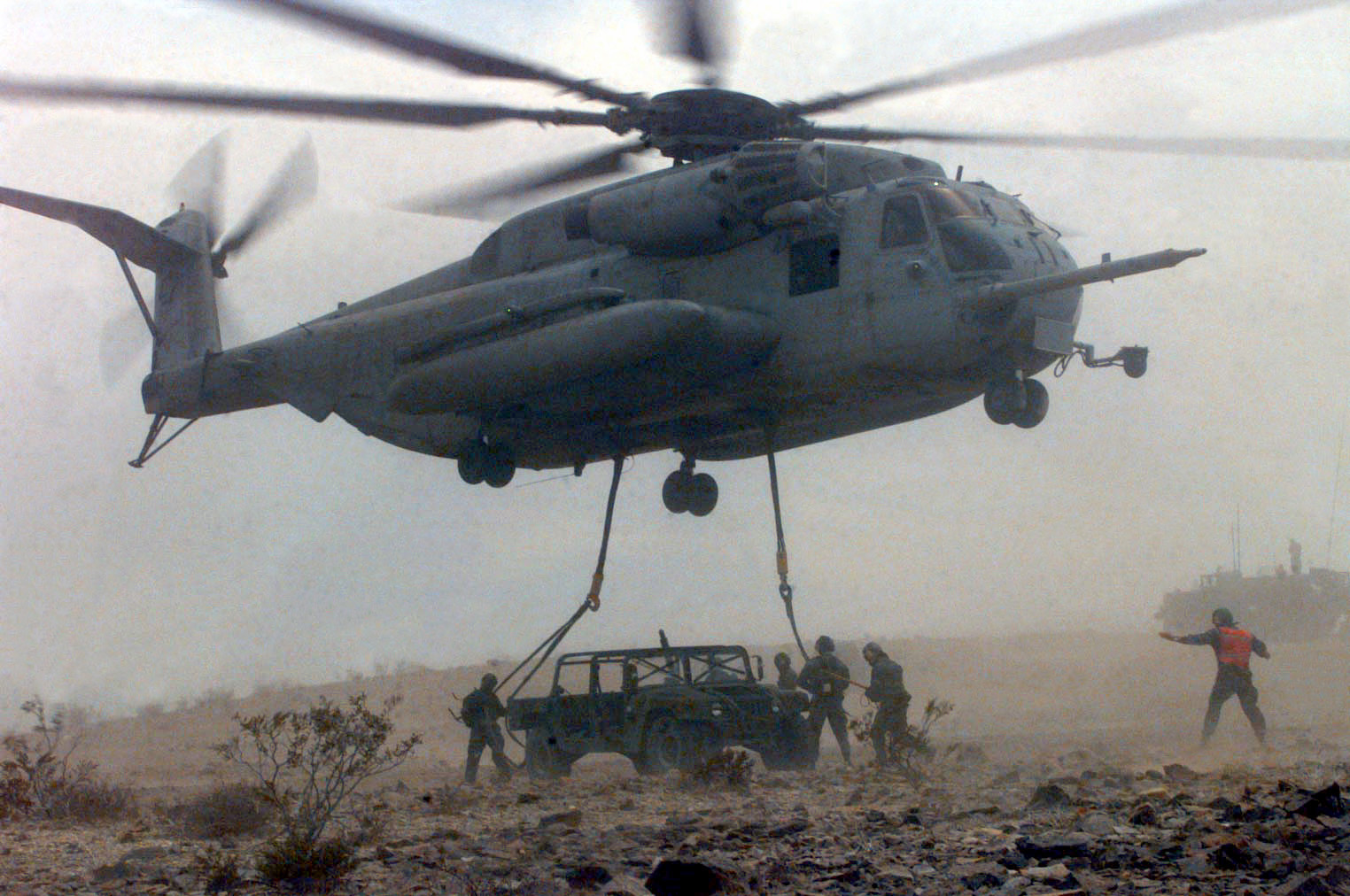
A CH-53E from HMH-461 doing external lifts during Combined Armed Exercise 6-97 (CAX 6-97).

In February 1990, HMH-461 deployed four aircraft aboard ship to support the presidential visit to the Anti-Drug Summit in Colombia.

Beginning in August 1990 through April 1991, the squadron deployed aboard USS Iwo Jima and headed to the conflict in the Persian Gulf. On 5 January 1991, Detachment Delta was retasked from DESERT STORM to support the non-combatant evacuation (NEO) of American citizens from war-torn Mogadishu, Somalia. The IRONHORSES flew almost 500-miles from the sea to successfully begin the NEO of American citizens and open Operation EASTERN EXIT.

Ironhorse Marines again deployed in October 1993 through June 1994 when a detachment of four aircraft left with HMM-362 for contingency operations in Haiti.

They deployed again in May and June 1997 when a detachment from this squadron participated in Operation Guardian Retrieval in Congo-Brazzaville. The detachment then conducted a non-combatant evacuation (NEO) in Sierra Leone as part of VMM-261(Rein) which was named Operation Noble Obelisk. The NEO saved U.S., British, and other third-country nationals who were threatened by the Revolutionary United Front.

=== 21st century ===
Following the attacks on 11 September 2001, HMH-461 was the first Marine Corps helicopter unit deployed to Djibouti, Africa, in support of Combined Joint Task Force - Horn of Africa. The deployment conducted multiple operations in support of special operations during the Global War on Terror. In June, while on a routine training mission (7) 1000 lbs bombs were dropped on two CH-53Es standing Casevac on the Godoria Range by an Air Force B-52. Captain Seth Michaud was killed in the mishap and both aircraft were destroyed. In October 2003, HMH-461 retrograded home to MCAS New River but would return again with detachments in 2004, 2005, 2006, 2007, 2008, 2009, 2010, and 2012.

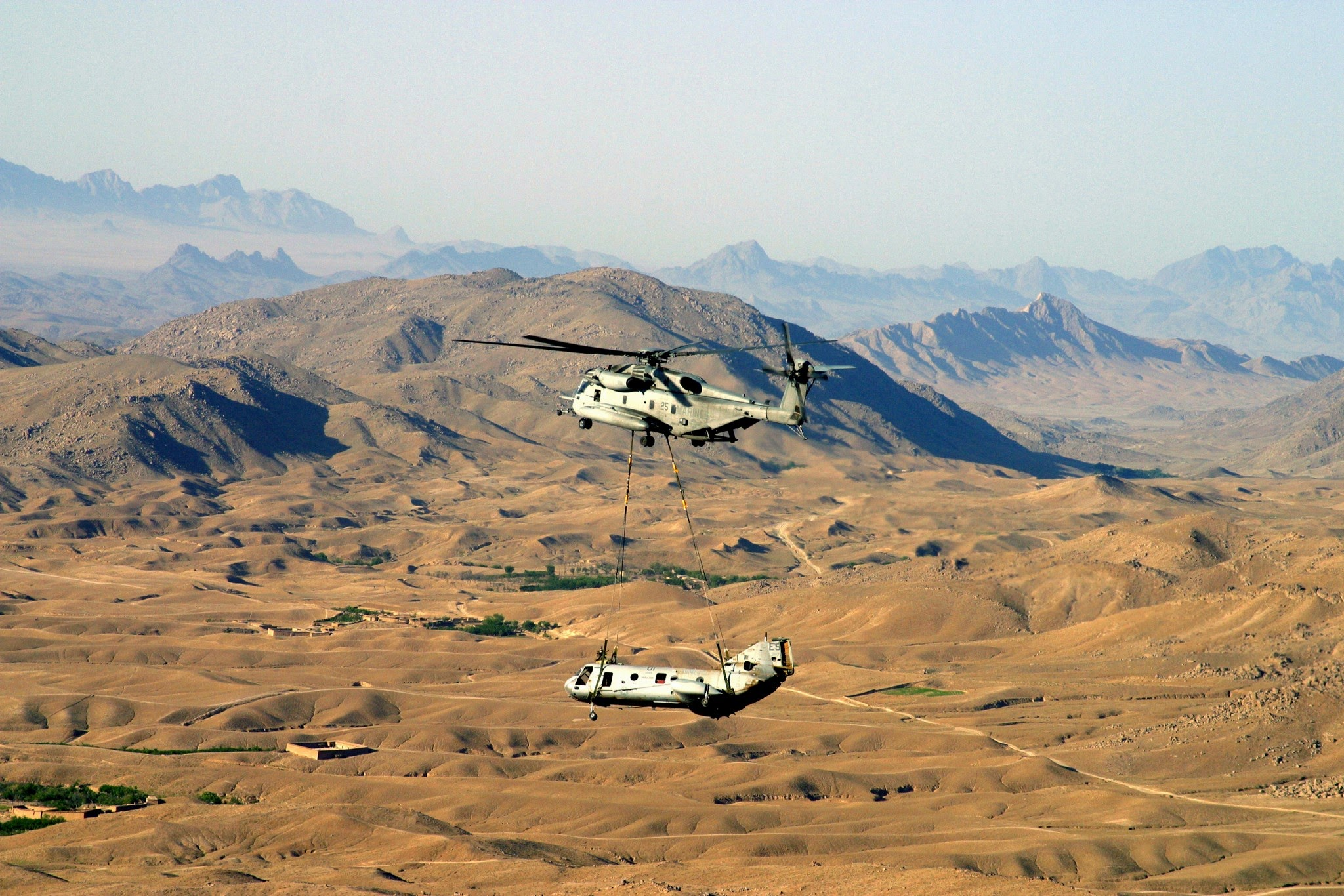
A CH-53E from HMH-461, attached to HMM-266, conducts a TRAP of a downed CH-46 in Afghanistan during the 2004 22 MEU deployment.

At the same time that the squadron main body was deployed to the Horn of Africa, HMH-461's Marines supporting the 22 MEU also encountered difficult flying in the treacherous mountains of Afghanistan. The 22 MEU ACE was stationed at the Kandahar airport in support of Operation Enduring Freedom and designated as part of Task Force Linebacker. The CH-53E proved invaluable in the challenging environmental conditions of Afghanistan. Throughout the spring and summer, the detachment helped efforts to battle Taliban forces, register 58,000 Afghan voters, and treat 2,000 medical and dental patients. After their successful 7-month deployment, the Ironhorses attached to HMM-266 returned to MCAS New River on 16 September 2004.

On 29 August 2005, HMH-461 received the order to deploy with 18 hours notice in support of relief operations for Hurricane Katrina. HMH-461 became the parent squadron and formed HMH-461(-)(REIN) with Marines and equipment from HMH-464, VMM-365, HMT-302 and VMM 264 to support the Special Marine Air-Ground Task Force for the disaster area. HMH-461 self-deployed to NAS Pensacola and started relief operations the next day in New Orleans and Mississippi. Their operations would continue for a month and would also serve to relieve the effects felt after Hurricane Rita made landfall.

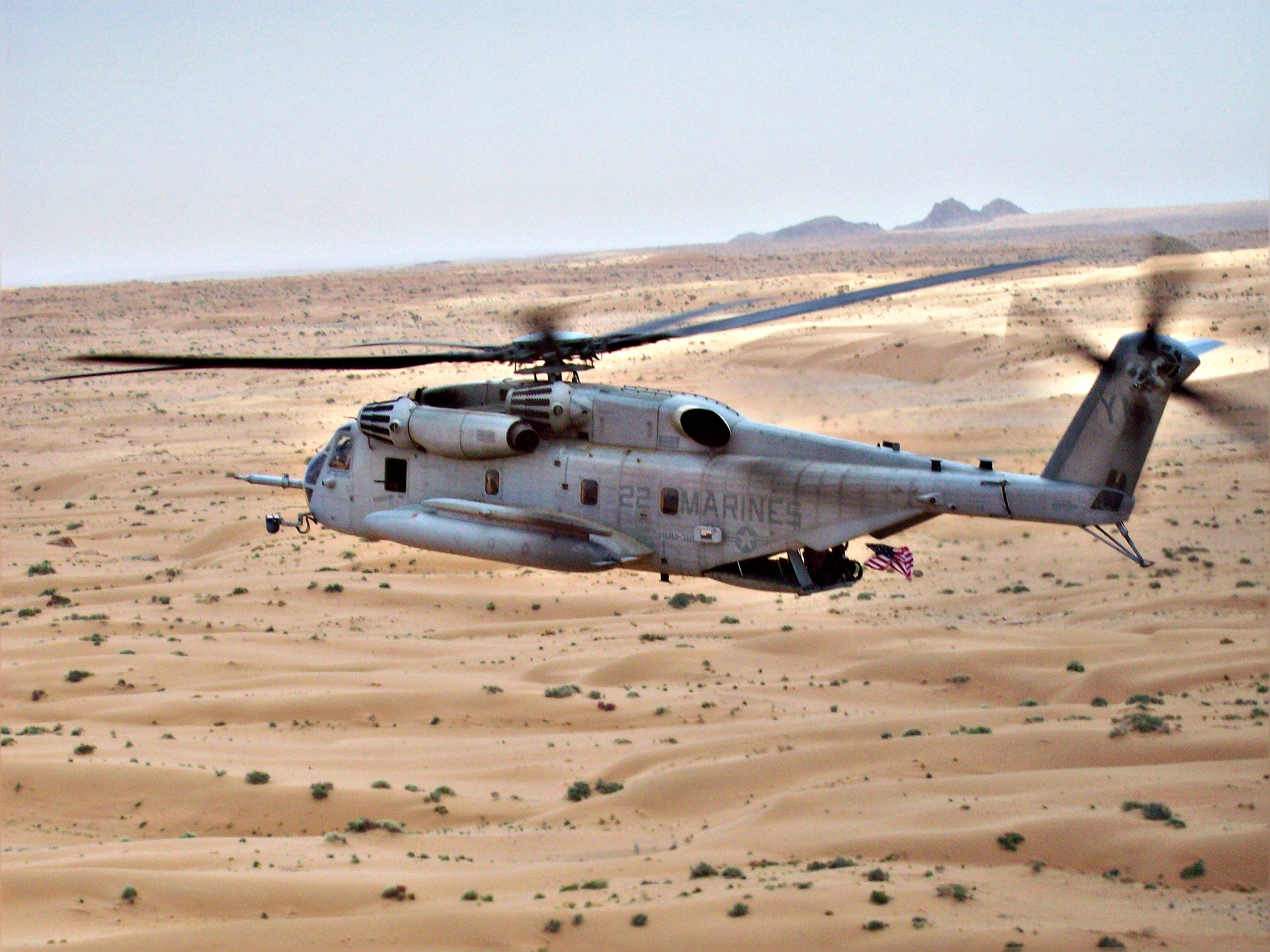
A CH-53E flown by HMH-461 Det A attached to HMM-365(REIN) flies over the Red Desert south of Kandahar, Afghanistan in support of Operation Azada Wosa.

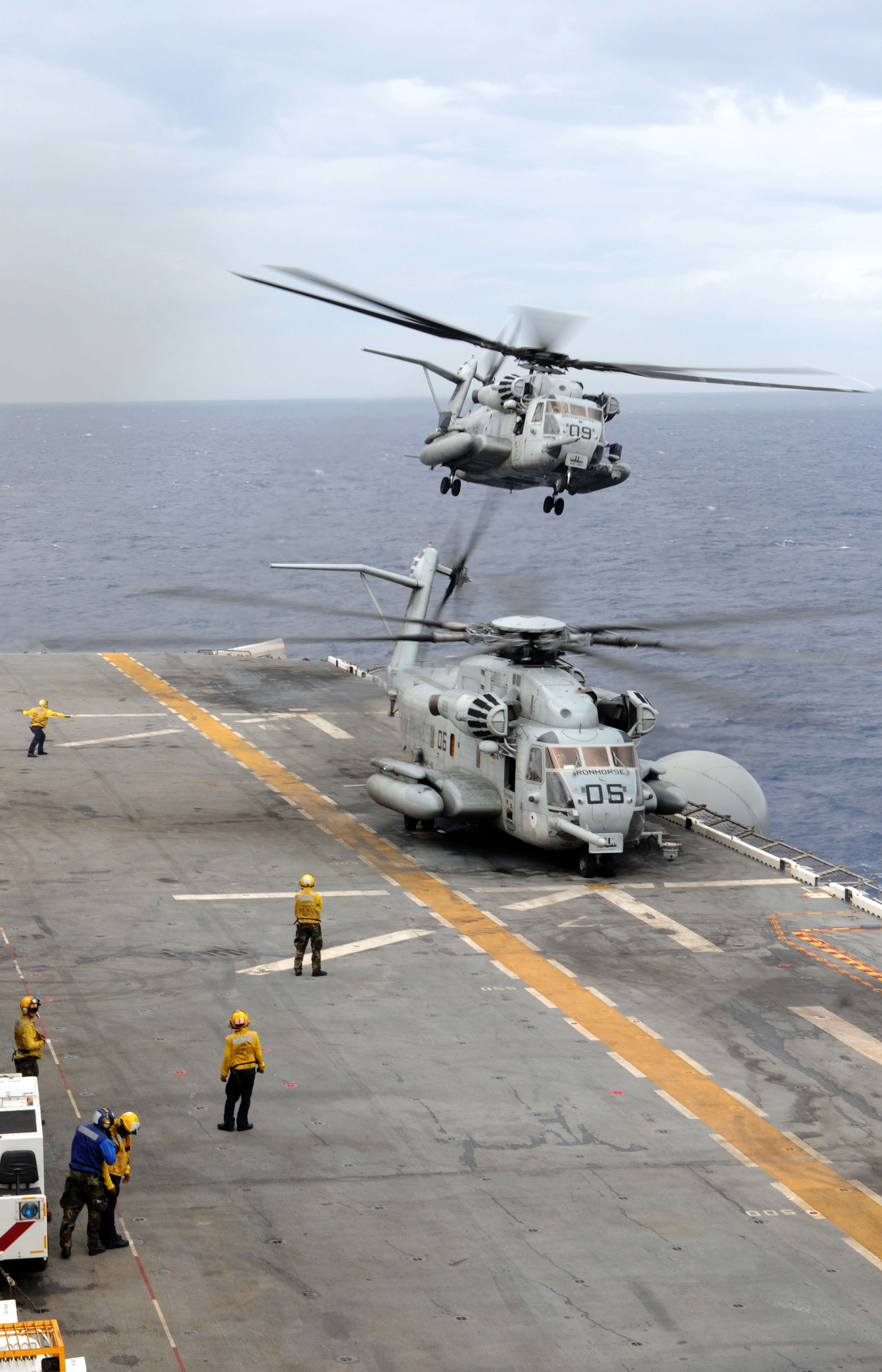
Two CH-53s of HMH-461 aboard USS Wasp, November 2009

Shortly after returning home, the squadron received a warning to embark HMH-461 to go to Mar Del Plata, Argentina to support the President of the United States in support of the 4th Summit of the Americas. Two and a half weeks were spent in Argentina before returning to United States.

While simultaneously deploying detachments to the Horn of Africa in 2005 and 2006, the squadron's detachment to HMM-261 in support of the 22 MEU, deployed from the Persian Gulf more than 456 miles inland to conduct operations supporting 2d MAW in Al Asad, Iraq. They supported OIF 04 -06 through daily operations within the Multi-National Forces-West Area of Operations. Following their operations in Iraq, the detachment then supported Operation Image Nautilus 2006 in Djibouti, Africa.

The next HMH-461 MEU detachment, attached to VMM-365 in August 2007 and would deploy to Kandahar, Afghanistan, in March 2008. The Marines of HMH-461 Det A continued to support the assault support and heavy lift requirements of the 24th MEU operating in the volatile Helmand Province of Afghanistan until they all returned home safely in November 2008.

Notice came again to deploy in June 2009 with five days warning in order to support Operation Jupiter Sentinel. The squadron rapidly embarked 4 aircraft and all available Ironhorse Marines aboard the USS Iwo Jima (LHD-7) which quickly started steaming towards the Ghanaian coast to support President Barack Obama's visit to Accra and Cape Coast Castle. In January 2010 the squadron was mobilized at short notice and transported the 22nd Marine Expeditionary Unit to aid relief efforts in Haiti after the recent devastating earthquake (Operation Unified Response). At the same time, the squadron's MEU detachment deployed early via strategic lift to support disaster relief operations in Pakistan following historic flooding.

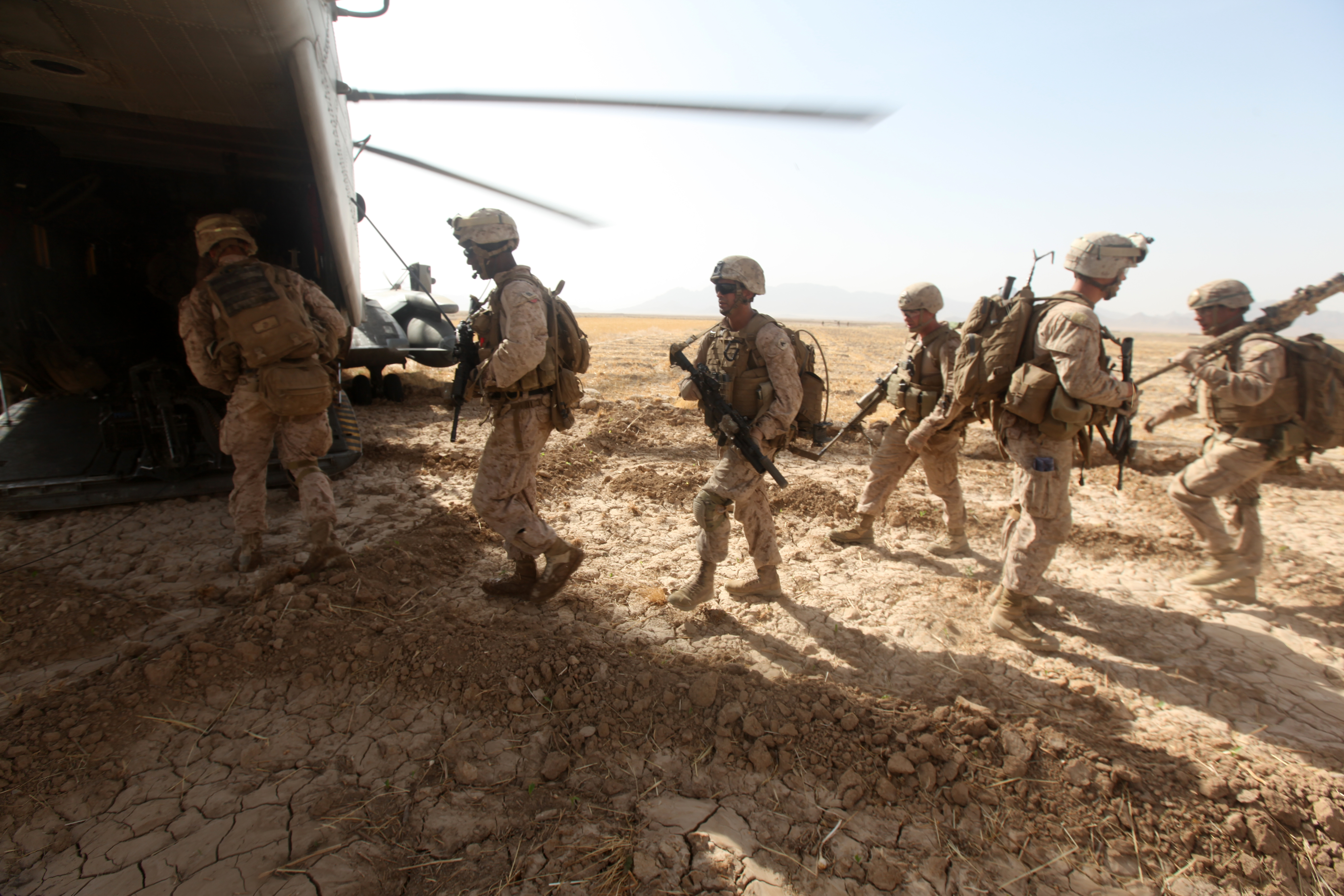
HMH-461 conducts a raid in support of Golf Company, 2nd Battalion, 8th Marines during OEF 13.1.

In January 2011, HMH-461, joined by a detachment from HMH-465, deployed to Camp Bastion, Afghanistan in support of Operation ENDURING FREEDOM 11.1. During the deployment, Ironhorse moved more than 7.7 million pounds of cargo, carried over 35,000 passengers, and conducted two Tactical Recovery of Aircraft and Personnel (TRAP) missions retrieving two crashed H-47 aircraft.

The squadron would deploy again to Camp Bastion in 2013, this time as an entire unit, in support of Operation ENDURING FREEDOM 13.1; moving more than 4.3 million pounds of cargo, 23,800 passengers, and completing more than 130 named tactical raids and assaults. For its operational excellence in Afghanistan, HMH-461 was awarded the Keith B. McCutcheon, Marine Heavy Helicopter Squadron of the Year Award in 2012 and 2014.

In May 2015, HMH-461, like before in the Horn of Africa, would be the lead active duty heavy lift detachment to send regular rotations to Soto Cano Air Base, Honduras as part of SPMAGTF-SC. The rotation would return in May 2018 to support volcano disaster relief and VIP visits including the Vice President of the United States.

In May 2019, HMH-461 detached 4 CH-53E's and 50 Marines to attach to VMM-365 (REIN). They comprised the heavy lift detachment of the Aviation Combat Element (ACE) for the 26th MEU. During the workups for the 26th MEU, Hurricane Dorian ravaged the Bahamas. The 26th MEU executed Foreign Disaster Relief (FDR) operations and provided aid to the Bahamas. The 26th MEU deployed December 2019 and operated in the 5th Fleet Area of Operations (AOR) until returning in July 2020. During the deployment, the HMH detachment operated in various Middle-Eastern countries in support of the 26th MEU operations in order to increase foreign relationships in the AOR. The HMH detachment was responsible for Expeditionary Airbase Operations (EABO) and Forward Arming and Refueling Points (FARP) operations to support the MAGTF commander.

The squadron would again send a detachment of 4 CH-53E's to VMM-263 in August 2020, to support the ACE for the 22nd MEU.

In January 2022, HMH-461 became the first operational unit in the Marine Corps to replace its CH-53E Super Stallion with the upgraded CH-53K King Stallion.

== Gallery ==
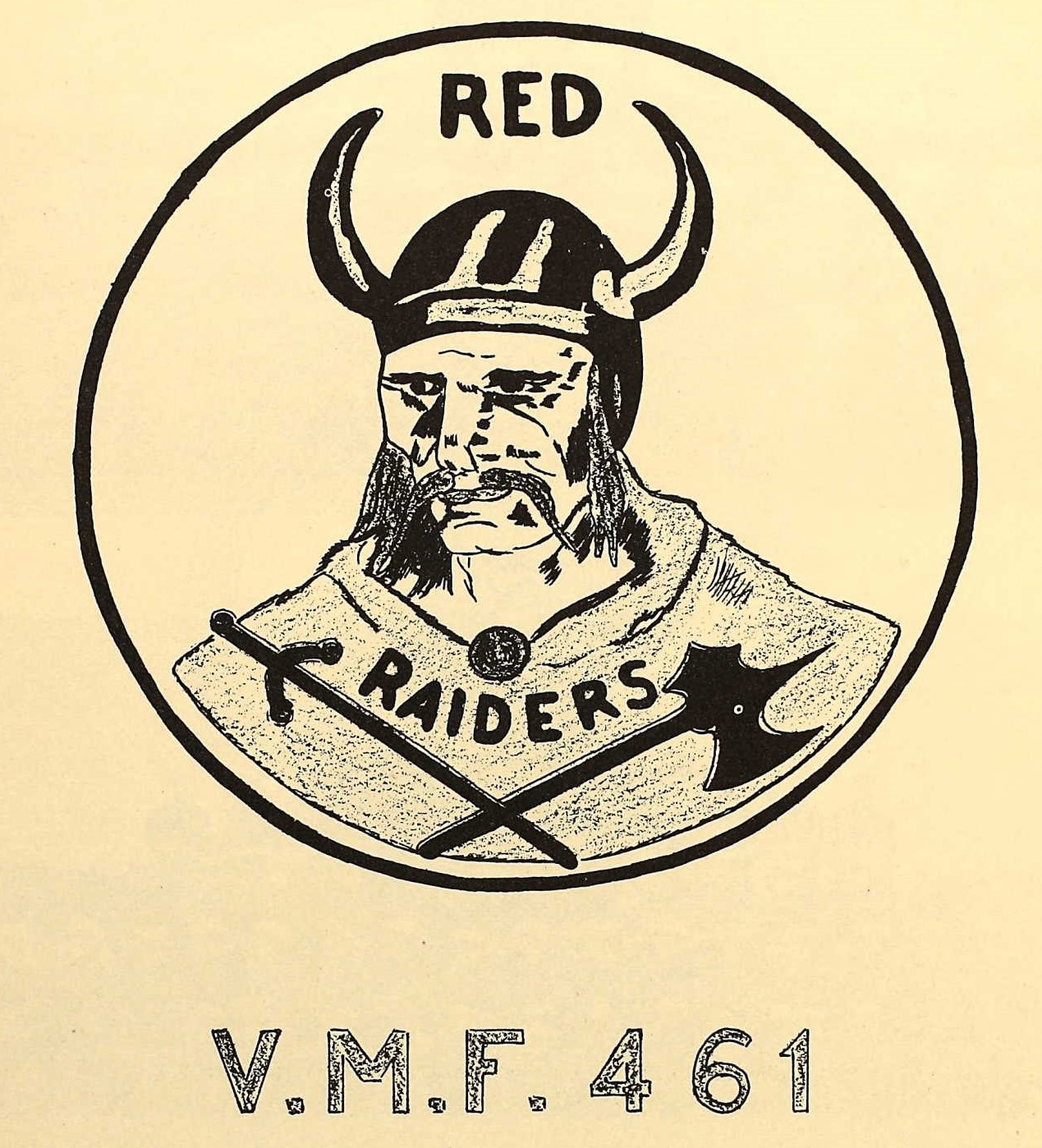
Squadron Insignia taken from the USS Leyte Cruisebook (September 1949 – January 1950)

== HMH-461 Squadron Commanders ==
Name	Dates in command	Name	Dates in command	Name	Dates in command
Griffith B. Doyle	12 Jan 57 – 16 May 58	Edward R. Seiffert	25 Mar 77 – 16 Nov 78	Scott W. Wadle	17 Sep 10 – 23 Mar 12
William R. Rozier	17 May 58 – 13 Aug 59	Warren D. Kalas	17 Nov 78 – 9 May 80	Nicholas A. Morris	23 Mar 12 – 18 Oct 13
James A. Etheridge	14 Aug 59 – 19 May 61	Peter F. Angle	10 May 80 – 22 May 81	Wade J. Dunford	18 Oct 13 – 1 May 15
George H. Green Jr.	20 May 61 – 15 Nov 61	Ernest G. Noll Jr.	23 May 81 – 24 Nov 82	Scott T. Trent	1 May 15 – 18 Nov 16
Eugene J. Pope	16 Nov 61 – 6 Apr 63	Henry A. Detering	25 Nov 82 – 28 Jun 84	David A. Schreiner	18 Nov 16 – 1 Jun 18
David Riley	7 Apr 63 – 16 Jun 64	Terry P. Swanger	21 Jun 86 – 16 Jan 87	Brian T. Laurence	1 Jun 18 – 12 Dec 19
Truman Clark	17 Jun 64 – 12 Jan 65	Thomas A. Reavis	17 Jan 87 – 2 Mar 89	Ryan A. Lynch	12 Dec 19 – 10 Jun 21
Royce W. Watson	13 Jan 65 – 14 Feb 65	Daniel J. Moseler	3 Mar 89 – 12 Jun 91	Adam A. Horne	10 Jun 21 – 16 Dec 22
Philip G. Dyer	15 Feb 65 – 1 Jun 65	Samuel T. Helland	13 Jun 91 – 27 May 93	Thomas L. Nicholson	16 Dec 22 - 05 Jun 24
R. L. Hawley	2 Jun 65 – 1 Jan 66	Spencer H. Smith	28 May 93 – 17 Nov 94	Matthew P. Bagley	05 Jun 24 - Present
Charles H. Northfield	6 Jan 66 – 3 Jan 67	Daniel C. Schultz	18 Nov 94 – 21 Jun 96		
Joseph L. Davis	4 Jan 67 – 5 Jun 68	John R. Suter	22 Jan 96 – 8 May 98		
James C. Robinson	6 Jun 68 – 30 Jun 69	Thomas L. Hanks	8 May 98 – 12 Apr 00		
Carroll G. Redman	1 Jul 69 – 17 Jan 70	Mark A. Clark	13 Apr 00 – 15 Nov 01		
Richard E. Skinner	18 Jan 70 – 7 Dec 70	Larry Fulwiler	16 Nov 01 – 2 Jun 03		
Donald E. Webb	8 Dec 70 – 31 Jan 72	Lawrence E. Miccolis	3 Jun 03 – 18 Nov 04		
Ernest G. Young	1 Feb 72 – 22 Jun 73	Robert D. Pridgen	18 Nov 04 – 19 May 06		
Robert D. Fowner	23 Jun 73 – 14 Nov 74	Francisco B. Crissafulli	19 May 06 – 19 Nov 07		
Billy G. Phillips	15 Nov 74 – 19 May 76	Paul H. Johnson	19 Nov 07 – 9 Mar 09		
Hubert M. Bartell	20 May 76 – 24 Mar 77	Sean M. Salene	9 09 - 17 Mar 10 Sep		

== Unit awards ==
A unit citation or commendation is an award bestowed upon an organization for the action cited. Members of the unit who participated in said actions are allowed to wear on their uniforms the awarded unit citation. HMH-461 has been presented with the following awards:

Streamer	Award	Year(s)	Additional Info
	Navy Unit Commendation Streamer with one Bronze Star		
	Meritorious Unit Commendation Streamer		
	World War II Victory Streamer	1941–1945	Pacific War
	National Defense Service Streamer with three Bronze Stars	1950–1954, 1961–1974, 1990–1995, 2001–present	Korean War, Vietnam War, Gulf War, war on terror
	Armed Forces Expeditionary Streamer	1992–1993	Somalia
	Southwest Asia Service Streamer with three Bronze Stars		
	Global War on Terrorism Expeditionary Streamer	2001–present	Horn of Africa
	Global War on Terrorism Service Streamer	2001–present	
	Afghanistan Campaign Streamer with two Bronze Stars	2011, 2013	OEF 11.1, OEF 13.1

== See also ==
- United States Marine Corps Aviation
- List of active United States Marine Corps aircraft squadrons

== Citations ==
Notes

- "HMH 461 History". US Marines official website. Archived from the original on 23 November 2016.
