= HMH-464 =

Marine Heavy Helicopter Squadron 464
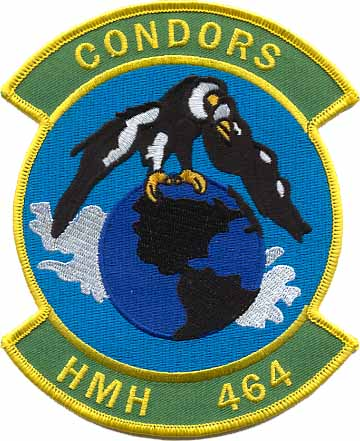
- HMH-464 Unit insignia
- Active: 15 April 1944 – 10 March 1946; 1 March 1981 – Present
- Country: United States of America
- Branch: United States Marine Corps
- Type: Heavy Helicopter Squadron
- Role: Assault support
- Part of: Marine Aircraft Group 29; 2nd Marine Aircraft Wing
- Garrison/HQ: Marine Corps Air Station New River
- Nicknames: Condors; Spanish Flies (WWII)
- Tail Code: EN
- Mascot: Condor
- Engagements: Operation Desert Storm; Operation Iraqi Freedom * 2003 invasion of Iraq; Operation Enduring Freedom

Commanders
- Commanding Officer: LtCol Jared B. Howells
- Executive Officer: Major Aaron T. Cauble

Aircraft flown
- Bomber: Curtiss SB2C-1 Helldiver (1941–46)
- Helicopter: Sikorsky CH-53E Super Stallion (1981–present) Sikorsky CH-53K King Stallion (2024-present)

Marine Heavy Helicopter Squadron 464 (HMH-464) is a United States Marine Corps helicopter squadron consisting of CH-53E Super Stallion transport helicopters. The squadron is known as the "Condors" and is based at Marine Corps Air Station New River in North Carolina. They fall under the command of Marine Aircraft Group 29 (MAG-29) and the 2nd Marine Aircraft Wing (2nd MAW).

== History ==
=== World War II ===
Marine Scout Bomber Squadron 464 (VMSB-464) was activated on 15 April 1944 at Marine Corps Air Station El Toro in California to train personnel. Their status changed in October of that year as they were designated a replacement training squadron. They were redesignated Marine Torpedo Bombing Squadron 464 (VMTB-464) on 1 June 1945. Following the surrender of Japan the squadron was deactivated as part of the general draw down of all U.S. forces on 10 March 1946.

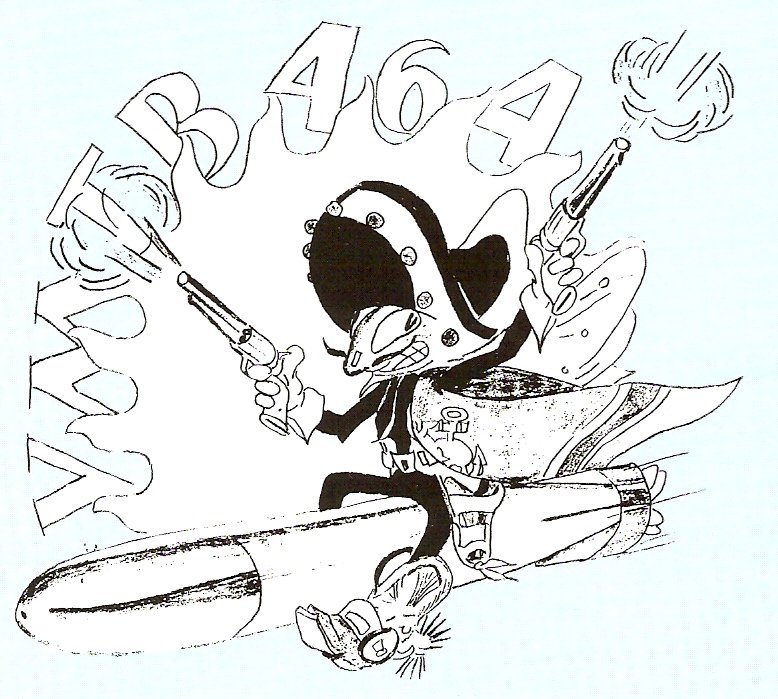
Squadron logo in WWII when they were VMTB-464

=== 1980s ===
Marine Heavy Helicopter Squadron 464 (HMH-464) was reactivated under the Command of LtCol Joseph G. Flynn at Marine Corps Air Station New River on 1 March 1981, tasked to receive and introduce the CH-53E Super Stallion to the Fleet Marine Force. It became the first Marine squadron to receive the first production CH-53E aircraft in mid-1981. In 1983, four of the squadrons CH-53E aircraft along with pilots and supporting ground crew, deployed as part of the 24th Marine Amphibious Unit aboard the USS Iwo Jima to Beirut, Lebanon. This was the first shipboard deployment of the new aircraft. While in theater, the aircraft provided heavy lift support during the deployment, and provided critical support during the aftermath of the tragic 23 October bombing of the Marine barracks.

The 10,000 mishap-free flight hour mark was attained in September 1984. Following Combined Arms Exercise 6/7, HMH-464 attained another first by flying non-stop from Marine Corps Air Station Yuma in Arizona to MCAS New River, utilizing aerial refueling to cover a distance of 1,870 miles (3,010 km). The squadron received the Commandant's Aviation Efficiency Trophy for 1987.

=== The Gulf War & the 1990s ===
After Iraq's invasion of Kuwait, HMH-464 provided eight CH-53Es and 84 Marines for the initial deployment to the Persian Gulf on 16 August 1990. Upon arrival in Saudi Arabia, the squadron played a key role in providing assault support to the 1st Marine Division as it prepared to liberate Kuwait. The Condors flew 304 combat sorties during Operation Desert Storm, delivering 2,167,150 pounds of cargo and transporting 1,686 passengers. The squadron returned from Southwest Asia in May 1991 and soon surpassed the 15,000-hour mishap free milestone.

In February 1993, HMH-464 was awarded the 2nd Marine Aircraft Wing Commanding General's Trophy, recognizing the squadron as the finest in the Wing. In October, the Condors surpassed the 20,000 mishap free flight hours milestone.

During the month of March 1994, the Condors assisted with the loading of ships for the Haiti crisis, enabling the forces to deploy on time. At the end of July 1994, HMH-464 detached four aircraft and 50 personnel to HMM-264 for the ongoing contingency operations in Haiti. While participating as part of the Special Marine Air Ground Task Force Caribbean (SPMAGTF CARRIB), the CH-53E detachment took part in numerous exercises in preparation for Operation Uphold Democracy and Operation Support Democracy.

In June 1995, HMH-464's detachment attached to HMM-263 (Rein), 24th Marine Expeditionary Unit (24th MEU), executed a successful Tactical Recovery of Aircraft and Personnel (TRAP) mission that rescued the downed United States Air Force pilot Captain Scott O'Grady from war-torn Bosnia. During 1995, HMH-464 simultaneously supported all three East Coast Marine Expeditionary Units with detachments, a first by a Marine Heavy Helicopter Squadron.

In 1999, the HMH-464 detachment assigned to the 26th Marine Expeditionary Unit (26th MEU), participated in a 45-day TRAP standby during Operation Allied Force, a non-combatant evacuation operation in Albania in support of Operation Shining Hope, peace enforcement operations in Macedonia and Kosovo in support of Operation Joint Guardian and humanitarian assistance in Turkey in support of Operation Avid Response.

During March, the Condors received a prepare to deploy order in support of the Department of Justice (DOJ) operations in Vieques, Puerto Rico. This time they deployed on the USS Bataan with SPMAGTF Vieques in support of Operation Eastern Access. The CH-53Es transported 1,565 passengers and carried 249,300 pounds of cargo. The squadron was a recipient of the Chief of Naval Operations (CNO) Safety Award in June and was also awarded the Marine Corps Aviation Association "HMH Squadron of the Year" during July.

== Global War on Terror ==
Following the 11 September 2001 attacks, a 4-plane detachment from HMH-464 deployed with the Blue Knights of HMM-365 (Rein) as the ACE for the 26th MEU. The MEU transited to a position off the coast of Pakistan to begin combat operations in support of Operation Enduring Freedom. HMM-365(Rein), in concert with HMM-163(Rein), launched (6) CH-53Es to secure Camp Rhino, nearly 800 nautical miles (1,500 km) inland. After securing Camp Rhino, Kandahar Airport was secured deep in Afghanistan.

In January 2003, the Condors were joined by Marines from HMH-461, HMT-302, and MAWTS-1 and deployed (16) CH-53E's and the entire squadron on amphibious ships to Kuwait as part of Marine Aircraft Group 29 which was the Aviation Combat Element of Task Force Tarawa and the 2nd Marine Expeditionary Brigade all in support of Operation Iraqi Freedom. Over the course of the operation, HMH-464 flew over 2300 hours, transported 4,695,950 pounds of cargo and 6,751 passengers, and had flown 1086 combat sorties in three months. Additionally, the squadron had operated from the austere Forward Operating Base (FOB), Jalibah in Southern Iraq, and supported a Forward Arming and Refueling Point (FARP) in Al Kut, Iraq. Missions executed included Assault Support (Movement of personnel and cargo), covertly inserting and extracting USMC Force Reconnaissance teams.

On their return home aboard USS Kearsarge, HMH-464 was tasked to bypass the scheduled liberty port in Malta and proceed to the African countries of Liberia and Sierra Leone to conduct Non-Combatant Evacuation Operations (NEO) and the Liberian Embassy reinforcement Operation Shining Express. After being stood down from this contingency, the squadron returned home in late June, 2003.

During November 2003, the squadron was tasked with sending a Detachment of 78 Marines to support a 4-plane detachment from MCAS New River to Camp Lemonnier, Djibouti in support of Combined Joint Task Force Horn of Africa (CJTF-HOA). The detachment deployed to Djibouti for a six-month deployment ending in May 2004.

The Condors earned the 2003 Chief of Naval Operations (CNO) Safety Award, the 2004 Department of the Navy (DON) Safety Excellence Award for Active Duty Marine Corps Squadron, and the 2004 Marine Corps Aviation Association (MCAA) Commandant's Trophy in recognition of the best overall performance and accomplishment of all assigned tasks by a Marine Corps Squadron.

The Condors returned to Camp Lemonnier a year later with Detachment Alpha in support of CJTF-HOA from May to October 2005.

On 29 August 2005, HMH-464 (-) was ordered to deploy with 18 hours notice in support of relief operations for Hurricane Katrina. HMH-464 joined Marines from HMH-461 (-) (Rein), HMM-365 (-) and HMH-772 (-) to support Joint Task Force Katrina. HMH-464 (-) self deployed to NAS Pensacola and started relief operations the next day in New Orleans and Mississippi. After working out of NAS Pensacola HMH-464 (-) moved to Keesler Air Force Base and continued relief operations from there. On 20 September 2005, HMH-464 (-) departed Keesler Air Force Base and returned home to MCAS New River. The Condor's flew 162 flight hours, transported 452 Evacuees, 1182 Passengers and 412,850 lb (187,270 kg) of Cargo in support of Hurricane Katrina relief operations.

HMH-464 Detachment Bravo relieved Detachment Alpha in Camp Lemonnier during October 2005. On 17 February 2006, tragedy struck as two CH-53E helicopters from Detachment Bravo crashed into each other off the northeast coast of Djibouti killing 8 Marines (2 pilots and 6 crew members) from the detachment and 2 Air Force Airmen that were on board providing satellite communications. Two Marine pilots survived the crash with injuries. Detachment Bravo was relieved by HMH-461.

The Condors returned to Camp Lemonnier with Detachment Alpha in support of CJTF-HOA from April to September 2007 and was relieved by Detachment Bravo September 2007 to Jan 2008.

During August 2008 Detachment Alpha returned to Camp Lemonnier in support of CJTF-HOA and will return to MCAS New River in Jan 2009.

August to December 2008 the Condors deployed (6) CH-53E's aboard the USS Kearsarge in support of a Humanitarian Mission Continuing Promise. The flag deployed to the Southern Command's Area of Operation. During the (4) month deployment the squadron provided support to Nicaragua, Colombia, Haiti, Dominican Republic, Trinidad and Tobago and Guyana.

== Exercise COLD RESPONSE 16 ==
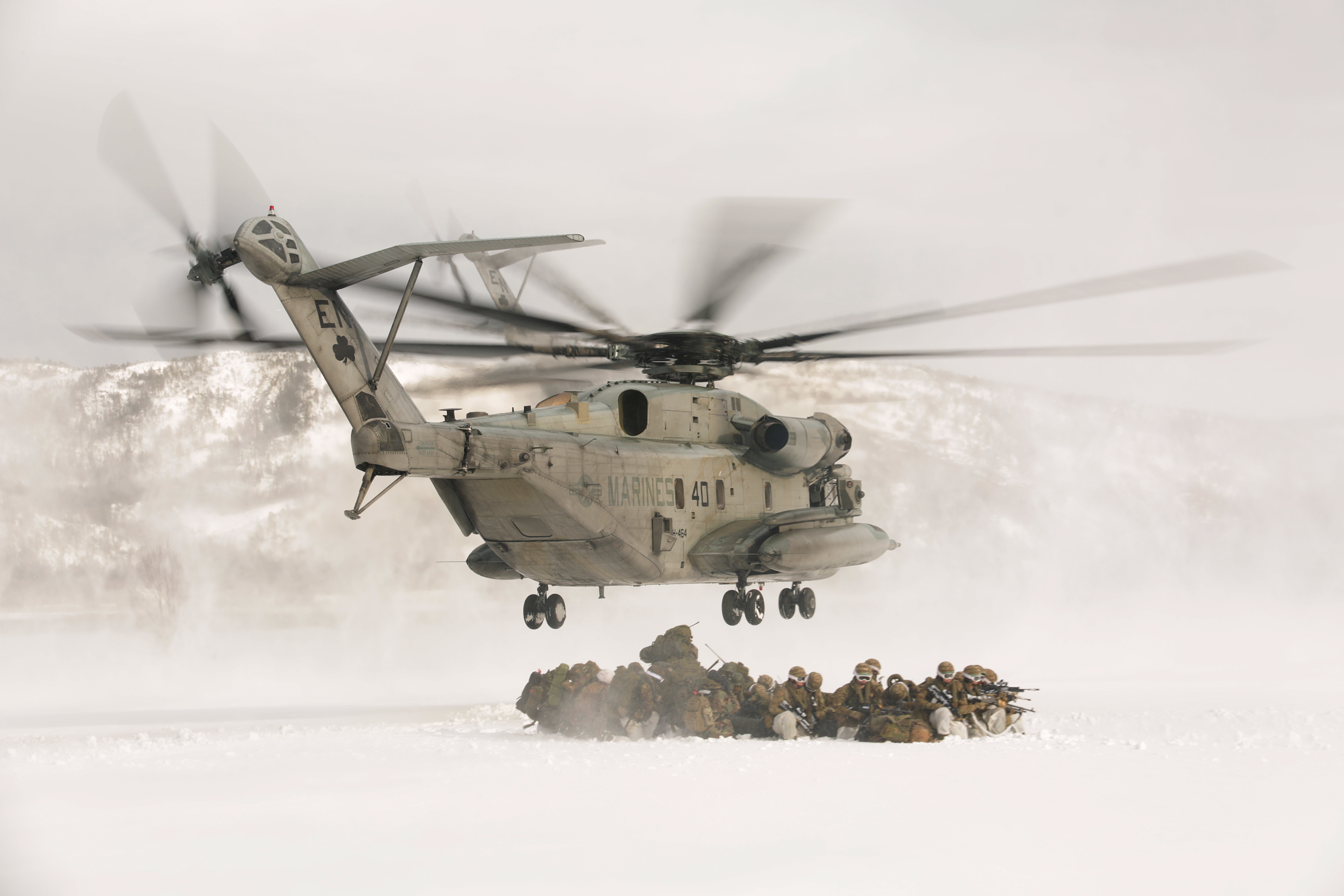
Condor Extract CR16

In January 2016 the Condors deployed (6) CH-53Es to Norway in support of Cold Response 16.

== Awards ==
The unit's honors include:

Presidential Unit Citation
Navy Unit Commendation
Meritorious Unit Commendation
American Campaign Medal
World War II Victory Medal
National Defense Service Medal w/ 1 service star
Southwest Asia Service Medal w/ 3 service stars
Global War on Terrorism Expeditionary Medal
Global War on Terrorism Service Medal

== See also ==
- List of United States Marine Corps aircraft squadrons
- United States Marine Corps Aviation
