= Marine Aircraft Group 26 =

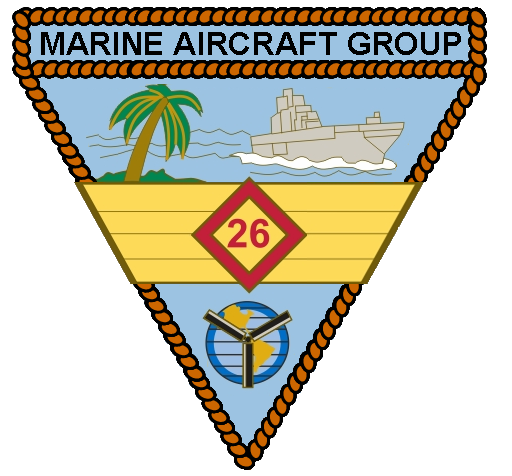
- Marine Aircraft Group 26 insignia
- Active: 16 June 1952 – present
- Country: United States
- Allegiance: United States of America
- Branch: United States Marine Corps
- Type: Tiltrotary Wing Aircraft Group
- Role: Assault Support; Training
- Part of: 2nd Marine Aircraft Wing; II Marine Expeditionary Force
- Garrison/HQ: Marine Corps Air Station New River
- Nickname: Flying Diamonds
- Engagements: Operation Desert Storm; War on terror: Operation Enduring Freedom; Operation Iraqi Freedom

Commanders
- Current commander: Col. Daniel W. Kaiser

Marine Aircraft Group 26 (MAG-26) is a United States Marine Corps aviation unit based at Marine Corps Air Station New River composed of seven MV-22 Osprey squadrons, one of which is the Fleet Replacement Squadron, an aviation logistics squadron, and a wing support squadron. It falls under the command of the 2nd Marine Aircraft Wing and II Marine Expeditionary Force.

== Subordinate units ==
- VMM-162
- VMM-261
- VMM-263
- VMM-266
- VMM-365
- VMMT-204
- MALS-26

== Mission ==
Exercise tactical command and control and provide responsive combat assault support, aviation logistics support, and aviation ground support to Marine, Joint, and Coalition forces to enable amphibious and expeditionary operations.

== History ==
=== 1950s through to the 1980s ===
Marine Aircraft Group 26 was commissioned on 16 June 1952 at Marine Corps Air Station Cherry Point, North Carolina, and was assigned to the 2nd Marine Aircraft Wing. The first operational Marine Aircraft Group arrived from MCAS Cherry Point in July 1954. Marine Aircraft Group 26—a group of helicopters originally commissioned in 1952—filled the needs of the Marine Corps to maintain a force which was expeditionary and amphibious in nature.

In July 1954, the group relocated to Marine Corps Air Station New River, North Carolina. On 1 March 1959, it was designated Marine Aircraft Group 26. During this period, the group flew 10 different types of aircraft. Elements of MAG-26 participated in the Cuban Missile Crisis; intervention in the Dominican Republic; Antilles disaster relief operation in the Dominican Republic; the Iranian hostage rescue attempt; Multinational Peacekeeping Force, Beirut, Lebanon; Operation Urgent Fury, Grenada and the Carriacou Islands; Hurricane Hugo relief, Puerto Rico and Charleston, S.C.; and Operation Sharp Edge, Monrovia, Liberia.

=== 1990s ===
In December 1990, MAG-26 relocated to expeditionary airfield Lonesome Dove in Jubail, Saudi Arabia, to support the I Marine Expeditionary Force and the 2nd Marine Division in the liberation of Kuwait during Operation Desert Storm. The composite squadron included nine squadrons from MAG-26, MAG-29 and the 4th Marine Aircraft Wing.

Elements of the group were involved in Operation Provide Comfort in northern Iraq and Turkey; Operation Victor Squared, Guantanamo Bay, Cuba; and Operation Deny Flight in the former Yugoslavia and the Adriatic Sea. The group is one of the most heavily tasked and deployed units in the Marine Corps and provides special operations capable aviation combat elements for the Marine Expeditionary Units in support of the 6th Fleet and Central Command elements.

Since January 1992, the group participated in Operation Provide Promise; Operation Southern Watch in which MAG-26 squadrons self-deployed in less than 12 hours, flew over a thousand miles and then embarked aboard ship; Operation Southern Support; Operation Support Democracy; Operation Sharp Guard; Operation Continue Hope; and Operation Uphold Democracy. In addition to deployments around the world, from 1 January 1993 to 31 December 1994, MAG-26 garrison squadrons accomplished an average of 10 major Marine exercises, 12 local exercises, 12 deployments for training and 60,455 mishap-free flight hours over the past two years.

The beginning of 1995 was met with many firsts for MAG-26. In conjunction with USS O'Bannon (DD-987), HMH-461 was the first fleet squadron to perform Hover In-flight Refueling while hovering astern a naval vessel. HMLA-167 was also the first squadron to employ Night Targeting System on the AH-1W SuperCobra.

As Hurricane Floyd moved up the East Coast in September 1999, soldiers, sailors, airmen and Marines relocated hundreds of military aircraft and vessels out of Floyd's path, and evacuated all non-emergency military and civilians to help ensure their safety. From Marine Corps Air Station, New River, N.C., all flyable CH-53E Super Stallion aircraft from Marine Aircraft Group 26 were evacuated to Maxwell Air Force Base, Alabama. All flyable CH-46E, UH-1N and AH-1W aircraft from Marine Aircraft Group 26 and all flyable CH-53E, CH-46E, UH-1N and AH-1W from Marine Aircraft Group 29 were evacuated to Wright-Patterson Air Force Base, Ohio. All grounded aircraft were secured within station hangars.

=== War in Iraq ===
On 28 January 2009, MAG-26 turned over with Marine Aircraft Group 16 and assumed primary command of aviation support in Iraq's Al Anbar Province. This year-long deployment for the MAG in support of Operation Iraqi Freedom culminated in November when the 2nd MAW headquarters turned over its mission as the aviation combat element of Multi-National Forces West to the MAG.

== See also ==
- United States Marine Corps Aviation
- List of United States Marine Corps aircraft groups
- List of United States Marine Corps aircraft squadrons
