= Task Force Tarawa =

2003 US Marine Brigade in Iraq

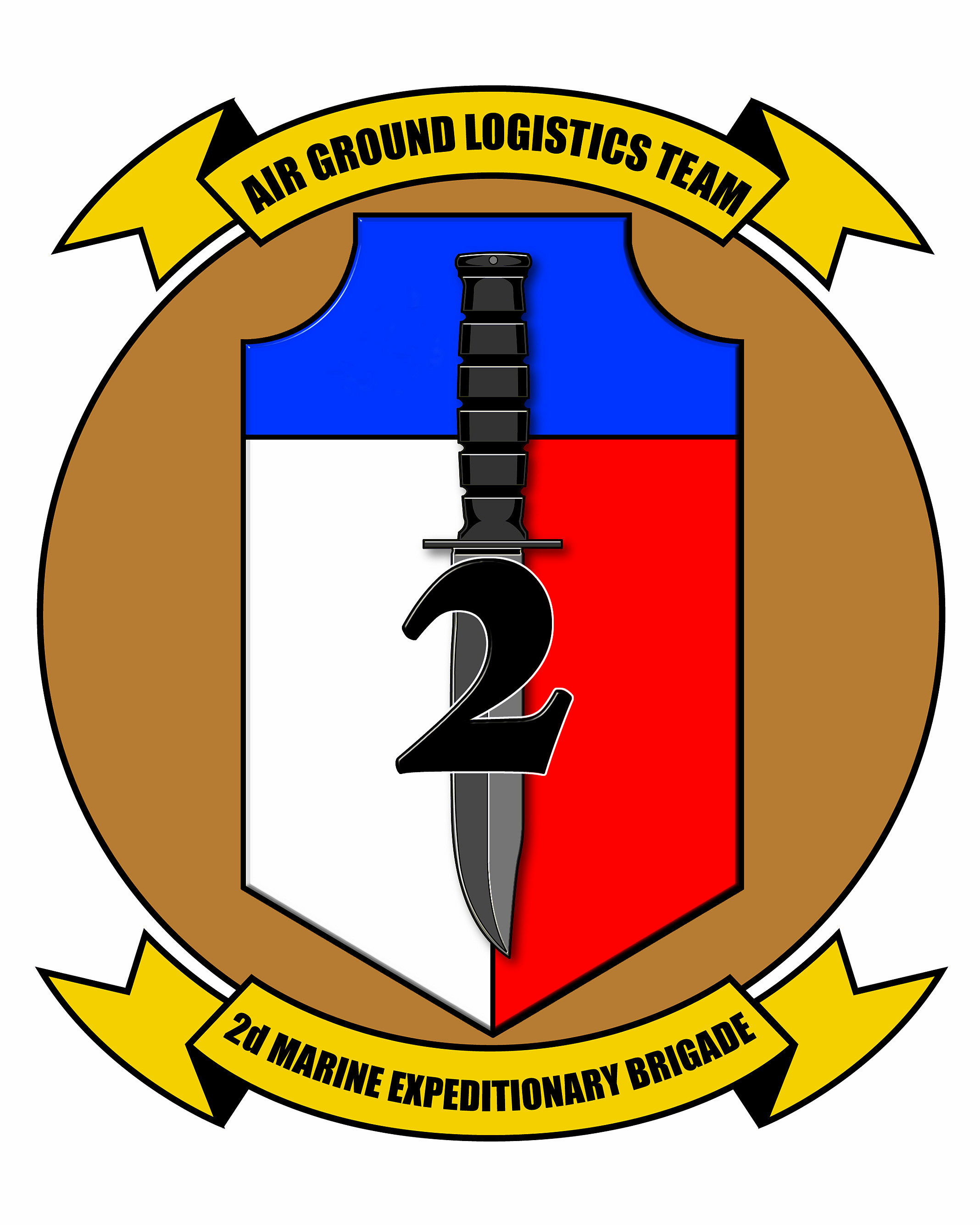
Insignia of the 2nd Marine Expeditionary Brigade

Task Force Tarawa (TFT) was the name given to the 2nd Marine Expeditionary Brigade during the 2003 invasion of Iraq. It was a Marine Air-Ground Task Force commanded by Brigadier General Richard F. Natonski that was attached to the I Marine Expeditionary Force during the course of the invasion and was most notable for its participation in the heavy fighting in the city of an-Nāṣiriyyah. During its time supporting Operation Iraqi Freedom, the task force suffered 23 Marines killed in action.

== Deployment ==
The 7,100 Marines and Sailors of TFT departed Marine Corps Base Camp Lejeune, North Carolina on January 15, 2003. They were transported on seven United States Navy ships that together formed Amphibious Task Force East (ATF East); otherwise nicknamed the 'Magnificent Seven'. The ships were the USS Kearsarge (LHD-3), USS Saipan (LHA-2), USS Bataan (LHD-5), USS Ashland (LSD-48), USS Portland (LSD-37), USS Gunston Hall (LSD-44), and the USS Ponce (LPD-15). ATF East arrived in Kuwait on February 15, 2003 and quickly debarked their aircraft and ships then headed into the northern Kuwaiti desert.

The Task force's equipment consisted of 81 aircraft, 46 Amphibious Assault Vehicles, 24 LAVs, 14 M1A1 Abrams tanks, 18 M198 howitzers, and 4 M9 ACEs. (however they only had 12 Abrams when the fighting started.)

== Operation Iraqi Freedom ==
TFT crossed into Iraq on March 21, 2003 with the missions of securing Jalibah Airfield and then securing the 3 bridges over the Euphrates River at An Nasiriyah to allow the 1st Marine Division to continue its attack north. From March 23 to March 29, 2003, Task Force Tarawa was engaged in heavy fighting in and around the city of An Nasiriyah as they came in contact with Saddam Hussein’s Fedayeen and members of the Iraqi 11th Infantry Division. TFT lost 18 Marines in the fighting and were involved in a friendly fire incident in which two A-10 Warthog aircraft killed a number of Marines when they strafed their Amphibious Assault Vehicles with 30mm depleted uranium rounds and Maverick missiles. The A-10 pilots were not prosecuted.

During this time, the original task force grew with the additions of the 15th and 24th Marine Expeditionary Units. The Marines of TFT were the first U.S. unit to come in contact with the remnants of the 507th Maintenance Company after they were ambushed; and later, were on standby to assist with the rescue of prisoner of war PFC Jessica Lynch.

After leaving An Nasiriyah, the Task Force was tasked with securing the highways to the rear of the 1st Marine Division, and on April 3, 2003, they secured the town of Ad Diwaniyah. They continued to move and on April 7, pushed into Al Amarah, securing the 10th Armoured Division HQ and the nearby Al Amarah airfield and finally ended the invasion outside of Baghdad after conducting security and stabilization operations in Al Kut on April 11.

On May 14, 2003, Task Force Tarawa turned its Area of Operations over to the 1st Marine Division and returned to the United States via naval ships.

While en route back to the United States on June 12, 2003, 3rd Battalion 2nd Marines (3/2) while aboard USS Kearsarge (LHD-3) was deployed in support of Operation Shining Express to support the rescue of U.S. embassy personnel and American citizens during the Second Liberian Civil War.

== Order of battle ==
- 2nd Marine Expeditionary Brigade - BGen R.F. Natonski

Company A, 8th Communication Battalion
Detachment, 2nd Intelligence Battalion - Maj J.P. Christopher
Detachment, 2nd Radio Battalion - Maj T. Naughton
2nd Marine Regiment

1st Battalion, 2nd Marines (1/2)
2nd Battalion, 8th Marines (2/8)
2nd Battalion, 6th Marines (2/6)
3rd Battalion, 2nd Marines (3/1)
1st Battalion, 10th Marines (1/10)
2nd Battalion, 25th Marines (2/25)
Company C, 2nd Light Armored Reconnaissance Battalion
Company B, 3rd Light Armored Reconnaissance Battalion
Company A, 2nd Reconnaissance Battalion
2nd Force Reconnaissance Company
Detachment, Company C, 4th Reconnaissance Battalion
Company A, 2nd Assault Amphibian Battalion (Attached to 1/2)
Company A, 8th Tank Battalion (Attached to 1/2) (deactivated currently Company E, 4th Tank Battalion)
2D Radio Bn
Company A, 2nd Combat Engineer Battalion
Company A, 6th Combat Engineer Battalion Battle Creek, MI

Marine Air Control Group 28

2d Low Altitude Air Defense Battalion
Marine Air Support Squadron 1

Marine Aircraft Group 29, MCAS New River, North Carolina

Marine Aviation Logistics Squadron 29
HMH-464
HMLA-269
HMM-162 - Helicopter Marine Medium

Combat Service Support Battalion 22

== See also ==
- Marine Expeditionary Unit
- Justin LeHew
