= Marine Aircraft Group 29 =

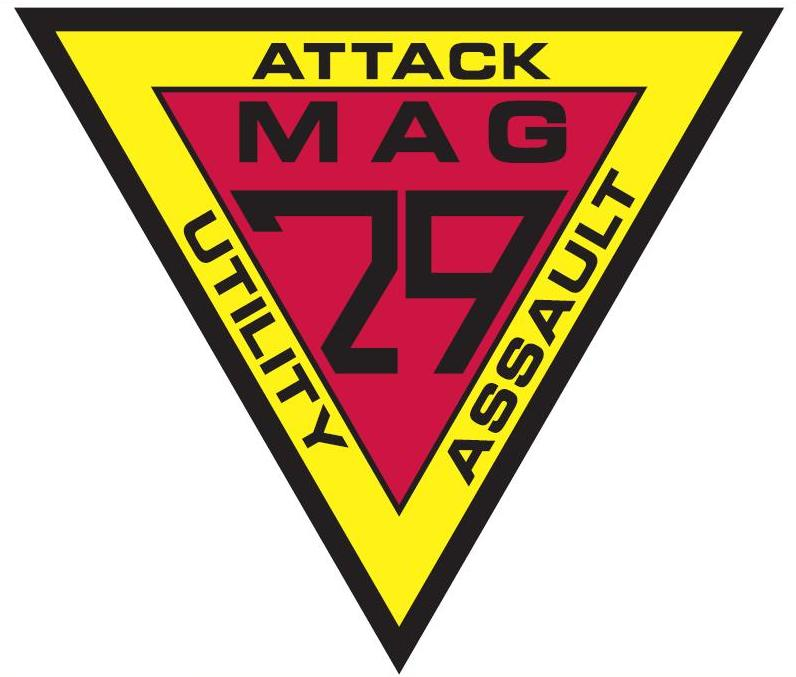
- MAG-29's insignia
- Active: 1 May 1972-Present
- Country: United States
- Branch: United States Marine Corps
- Type: Helicopter Aircraft Group
- Role: Assault Support; Close-in Fire Support; Training
- Part of: 2nd Marine Aircraft Wing; II Marine Expeditionary Force
- Garrison/HQ: Marine Corps Air Station New River
- Nickname: War Eagles
- Mottos: Utility, Attack, Assault
- Engagements: Operation Desert Storm; Operation Restore Hope; Operation Enduring Freedom; Operation Iraqi Freedom

Commanders
- Commanding Officer: Col Everett M. Good
- Executive Officer: LtCol Walter C. Cunningham III

Marine Aircraft Group 29 (MAG-29) is a United States Marine Corps aviation unit based at Marine Corps Air Station New River, North Carolina. The group is currently composed of four CH-53E Super Stallion squadrons including the Fleet Replacement Squadron, two Light Attack Helicopter Squadrons flying AH-1Z Vipers and UH-1Y Venoms, and a maintenance and logistics squadron.

== Mission ==
Provide air support to Marine Air-Ground Task Force commanders.

== Subordinate units ==
Light Attack Helicopter squadrons

- HMLA-167
- HMLA-269

Heavy Helicopter squadrons

- HMH-461
- HMH-464

Heavy Helicopter Training squadron

- HMHT-302

== History ==
=== Early years and the 1980s ===
Marine Aircraft Group 29 was commissioned 1 May 1972 from Marine Helicopter Training Group 40 (MHTG-40) at Marine Corps Air Station New River, Jacksonville, North Carolina. MAG-29 was composed of Headquarters & Maintenance Squadron (H&MS-29), Marine Air Base Squadron 29 (MABS-29), and Marine Light Helicopter Squadron 268 (HML-268). The squadrons were newly designated units awaiting assignment of personnel and material.

Four days after its activation, MAG-29 received its first aircraft, the UH-1N, directly from Bell Helicopter in Fort Worth, Texas. Eleven days later, the Group more than doubled in size with the addition of HML-167, HMA-269, and VMO-1 from Marine Aircraft Group 26.

During 1982, the first phases of the MAG-29/MAG-26 reorganization were completed with the composition of UH-1N and AH-1T aircraft in HML-167 and HMA-269, and transfer of HMM-162 and HMH-464 to MAG-29 from MAG-26. During 1983, MAG-29 received HMM-365 and HMM-263 to complete the MAG-29/MAG-26 reorganization.

=== 1990s ===
MAG-29 deployed in support of Operation Desert Shield and Operation Desert Storm.

During 1993, MAG-29 units supported UN Operation Restore Hope and Operation Continue Hope in Somalia and Operation Deny Flight and Operation Provide Promise in the former Yugoslavia. During the summer of 1994, MAG-29 personnel and aircraft supported Operation Restore Democracy in Haiti. On 7 June 1995, HMM-263 successfully rescued downed U.S. Air Force pilot Captain Scott O'Grady.

In 1999, MAG-29 saw yet another real world contingency in the deployment of HMM-365(REIN). As the ACE for the 26th MEU, HMM-365(REIN) supported numerous operations in the countries of Albania, Kosovo, and Macedonia, Humanitarian Assistance in Turkey and participated in Operation Allied Force, Operation Allied Harbor, Joint Task Force shining Hope, Operation Noble Anvil, Operation Joint Guardian, and Operation Avid Response.

=== Global War on Terror ===
After the 11 September attacks, MAG-29 prepared for support operations in New York City and contingency operations overseas. HMM-365(Rein) was quickly deployed and ordered to be among the first troops into Afghanistan in support of Operation Enduring Freedom. Following that, MAG-29(Rein) was ordered to deploy in January 2003 to become the 3rd Rotary Wing Group for the 3rd Marine Aircraft Wing in support of Operation Iraqi Freedom. The group returned from Iraq in June 2003. MAG-29 deployed to Iraq in support of OIF 07–08. In June 2008, they returned to their headquarters in MCAS New River.

== See also ==
- United States Marine Corps Aviation
- List of United States Marine Corps aircraft groups
- List of United States Marine Corps aircraft squadrons
