= HMLA-269 =

Marine Light Attack Helicopter Squadron 269
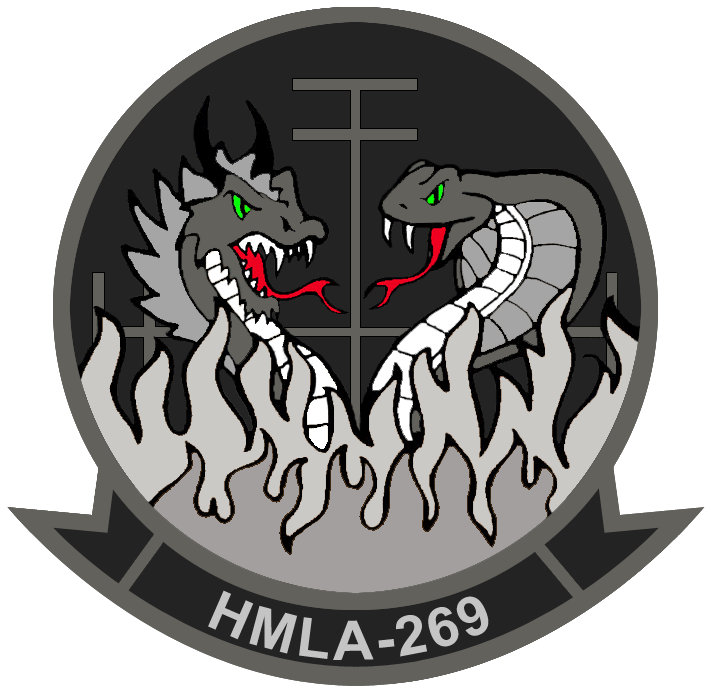
- The Gunrunner's new insignia
- Active: 22 February 1971 – 9 December 2022 Reactivated July 1, 2024
- Country: United States
- Branch: United States Marine Corps
- Type: light attack helicopter squadron
- Role: Close air support Air interdiction Assault support Utility support
- Part of: Marine Aircraft Group 29; 2nd Marine Aircraft Wing
- Garrison/HQ: Marine Corps Air Station New River
- Nicknames: The Gunrunners, Lawmen (callsign)
- Mottos: "The First and the Finest", "Protect the Innocent, Punish the Guilty"
- Tail Code: HF
- Engagements: Operation Desert Storm; Operation Restore Hope; Operation Uphold Democracy; Bosnian War; Operation Silver Wake; Operation Assured Response; First Congo War; Operation Joint Guardian; Operation Enduring Freedom; Operation Iraqi Freedom

Commanders
- Commanding Officer: LtCol Jens "Merica" Gilbertson

Aircraft flown
- Attack helicopter: AH-1J/T/W/Z Sea Cobra/Super Cobra/Viper (1971–present)
- Utility helicopter: UH-1N/Y Twin Huey/Venom (1980s-present)

Marine Light Attack Helicopter Squadron 269 (HMLA-269) is a United States Marine Corps helicopter squadron consisting of AH-1Z Viper attack helicopters and UH-1Y Venom utility helicopters. Also known as "The Gunrunners", the squadron is based at Marine Corps Air Station New River in North Carolina and fell under the command of Marine Aircraft Group 29 (MAG-29) and the 2nd Marine Aircraft Wing (2nd MAW).

== Mission ==
The mission of HMLA-269 is to support the Marine Air-Ground Task Force commander by providing offensive air support, utility support, armed escort, and airborne supporting arms coordination; day or night; under all weather conditions; during expeditionary, joint, or combined operations.

== History ==
=== Early years ===
HMA-269 was formed at Marine Corps Air Station New River on 22 February 1971 and activated on 1 July 1971 as the Marine Corps first designated attack helicopter squadron. Equipped with the AH-1J "Sea Cobra," HMA-269's mission was to provide close-in fire support during aerial and ground escort operations during ship to shore movement and subsequent operations ashore.

In December 1977 under the command of LT. Col. W.C. Ryan III, HMA-269 took delivery of the first AH-1T (TOW) Cobra. The squadron opened a new era of attack helicopter aviation in early 1979 by being the first Marine Corps squadron to fire the TOW anti-tank missile from an airborne platform.

In the early 1980s, with the addition of the UH-1N to the squadron, HMA-269 became HMLA-269 and expanded its primary mission to include utility helicopter support. Though heavily committed, HMLA-269 maintained its impressive list of firsts; first flight-test of biochemical protective suits in the AH-1T (TOW), first flight test of "fast rope insertion" equipment, first to refine the TOW missile engagement gun and missile radars. Additionally, the squadron participated in the first actual movement of 2nd Marine Aircraft Wing assets in an air contingency drill. In 1986, The Gunrunners achieved yet another first when they fired a Sidewinder air-to-air missile at a target drone over the Island of Vieques, Commonwealth of Puerto Rico. These achievements earned the squadron a Meritorious Unit Commendation and selection as the Marine Corps Helicopter Squadron of the Year for 1986. It was common practice during this period to split the squadron into detachments. At one time during 1988 while commanded by Lt. Col. Christopher B. Stoops, the squadron deployed for the Persian Gulf while simultaneously operating three other detachments in North Carolina and the Caribbean Sea.

=== The Gulf War & the 1990s ===
In 1990, the Gunrunners deployed to Southwest Asia with twelve AH-1Ws, three AH-1Ts, and six UH-1Ns. These assets participated in a major 4th Marine Expeditionary Brigade exercises during Operation Desert Shield. During Operation Desert Storm, the squadron conducted critical on-call close-in fire support, escort for minesweeping aircraft, Surface Combat Air Patrol, and air intercept operations. Meanwhile, Gunrunner Hueys played a vital role in the raid on Faylaka Island, firing in excess of 75 2.75-inch rockets at fortified Iraqi positions under NVG low light level conditions.

Following the Gulf War, the Gunrunners continued to support requirements of LF6F deployments, in such areas as Yugoslavia, Somalia, and the Middle East. The squadron also supported numerous 2nd Marine Aircraft Wing and Marine Forces Atlantic exercises, both in the continental United States (CONUS) and abroad, including exercises in Norway and Puerto Rico. In 1994 the Gunrunners were tasked with providing a detachment on short notice to HMM-264 for Special Purpose MAGTF-CARIB in support of Operation Uphold Democracy in Haiti. One year later, on 6 June 1995, two Gunrunner cobras, assigned to HMM-263 and the 24th Marine Expeditionary Unit escorted two CH-53Es from the USS Kearsarge to successfully rescue Air Force Captain Scott O'Grady. During this deployment, HMLA-269 also became the first squadron to deploy the new Night Targeting System on all of its cobras; effectively adding increased combat compatibility to the forward deployed forces. Being named the HMLA Squadron of the Year rewarded the squadron's hard efforts that year.

The squadron also supported detachments with LF6F deployments that supported Operation Assured Response in Liberia. In 1997 the HMLA detachment to HMM-365 supported Operation Silver Wake in Albania and Operation Guardian Retrieval in the Democratic Republic of Congo. In recognition of its hard-earned reputation for setting the standard in attack helicopter aviation, the Gunrunners were designated the Marine Light Attack Helicopter Squadron of the Year in 1998 by the Marine Corps Aviation Association.

=== Global War on Terror ===
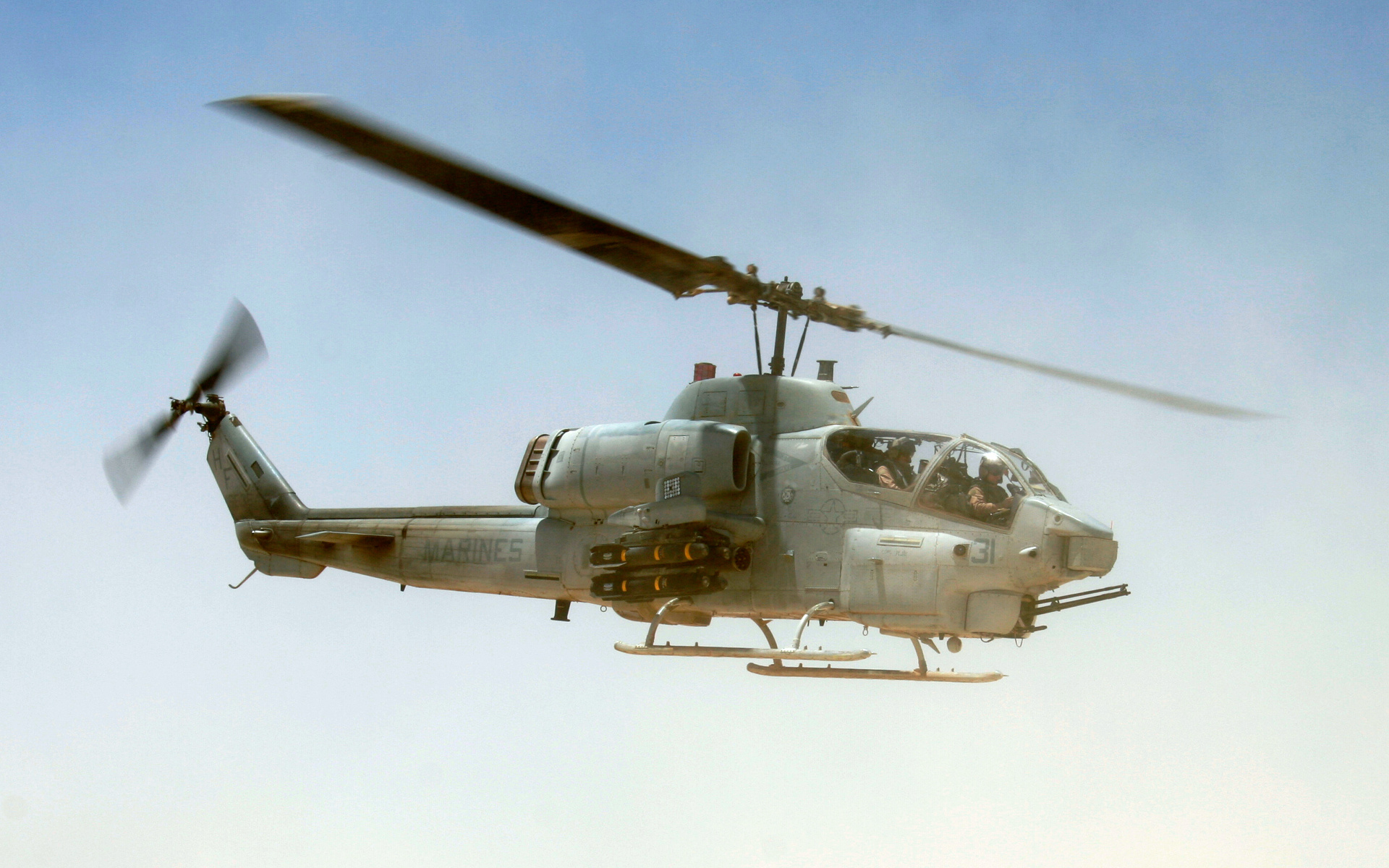
HMLA-269 Cobra escorts a MEDEVAC flight near Al Qaim, Iraq, on 17 June 2005, during Operation Spear.

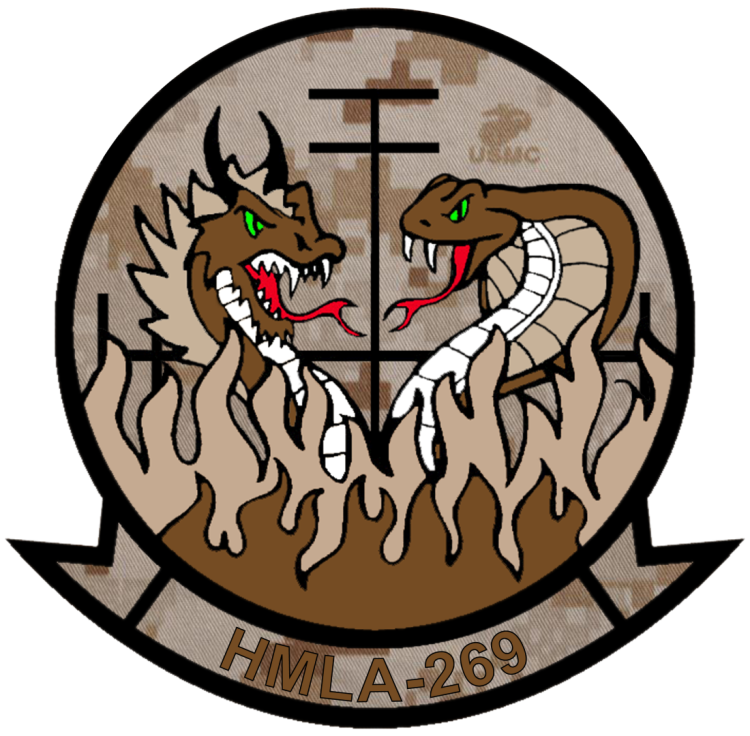
The desert version of The Gunrunners' new patch

In the wake of the September 11 attacks, The Gunrunners attached to HMM-365 (Rein) with 26th Marine Expeditionary Unit (SOC) flew combat missions in support of Operation Enduring Freedom from Forward Operating Bases Rhino and Kandahar in Afghanistan. In 2002 The Gunrunners attached to HMM-263 (REIN) with the 24th Marine Expeditionary Unit (SOC) flew in Kosovo, the Horn of Africa, Operation Enduring Freedom.

In January 2003, The Gunrunners deployed as a squadron in support of Operation Iraqi Freedom. HMLA-269 flew nearly 3,000 combat hours in 55 days and maintained 24-hour operations with no personnel losses due to enemy action or mishaps. January 2005 saw The Gunrunners again deploy to Iraq in support of OIF 04-06. During this deployment, The Gunrunners flew more than 5951 hours and 3994 sorties. The squadron celebrated its 35th anniversary on 1 July 2006 with a ceremony at Al Asad airbase in western Iraq. The squadron has completed six deployments to Iraq since 2003 and designated Marine Light Attack Helicopter Squadron of Year in 2010 and 2013.

== See also ==
- United States Marine Corps Aviation
- List of active United States Marine Corps aircraft squadrons
- List of inactive United States Marine Corps aircraft squadrons
