= VMM-365 =

United States Marine Corps squadron

Marine Medium Tiltrotor Squadron 365
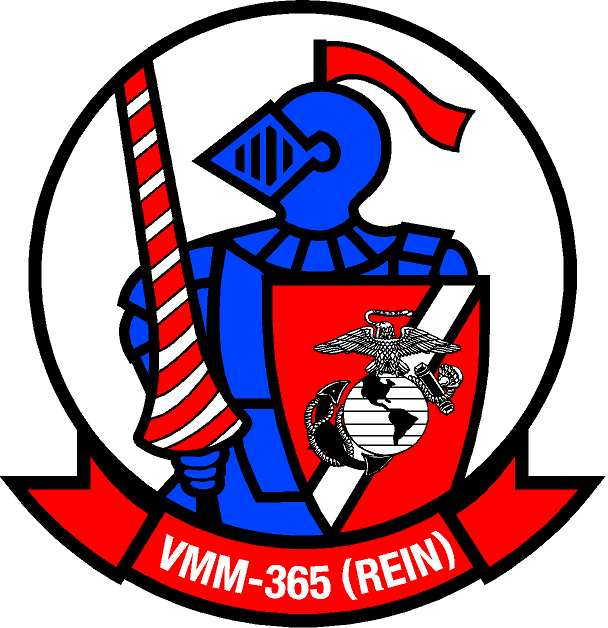
- VMM-365(REIN) Insignia
- Active: 1 July 1963 - 1 March 1971; 13 June 1980 - present
- Country: United States
- Branch: USMC
- Type: Marine Medium-lift Tiltrotor Squadron
- Role: Conduct air operations in support of the Fleet Marine Forces
- Part of: Marine Aircraft Group 26; 2nd Marine Aircraft Wing
- Garrison/HQ: Marine Corps Air Station New River
- Nickname: Blue Knights
- Patron: Second To None
- Tail Code: YM
- Mascot: Lancer
- Engagements: Vietnam War; Operation Desert Storm; Operation Iraqi Freedom; 2003 invasion of Iraq; Operation Enduring Freedom

Commanders
- Current commander: LtCol Mackenzie J. White

Marine Medium Tiltrotor Squadron 365 (VMM-365) is a United States Marine Corps tiltrotor squadron consisting of MV-22B Osprey transport aircraft. The squadron, known as the "Blue Knights", is based at Marine Corps Air Station New River, North Carolina and falls under the command of Marine Aircraft Group 26 (MAG-26) and the 2nd Marine Aircraft Wing (2nd MAW).

== Mission ==
Provide assault support of combat troops, supplies, and equipment during amphibious operations and subsequent operations ashore.

== History ==
=== Vietnam War ===
Marine Medium Helicopter Squadron 365 was established on 1 July 1963 at Marine Corps Air Facility Santa Ana, California. Flying UH-34Ds, the squadron's mission was to provide assault transport of troops and cargo in support of Fleet Marine Forces during ship-to-shore movements. HMM-365 was reassigned to Marine Corps Air Station Futenma, Okinawa in August 1964 in preparation for the squadron's deployment to the Republic of Vietnam. The squadron arrived at Da Nang Air Base on 7 October 1964 and immediately began performing re-supply missions in support of Operation Shufly.

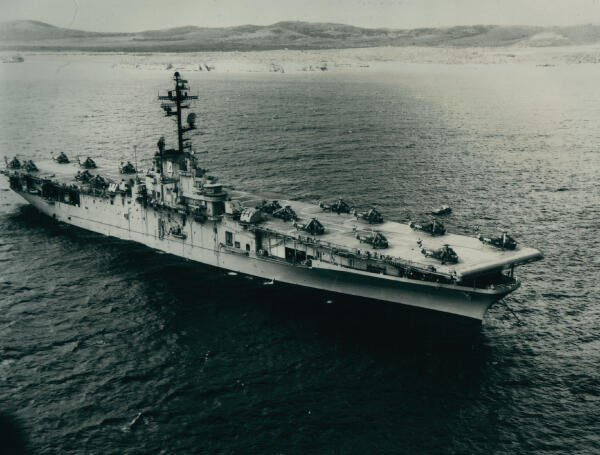
HMM-365 UH-34Ds aboard USS Boxer off Puerto Rico, 1966.

On 11 October, the newly arrived Marine pilots and aircrews were involved in their first firefight when 8 UH-34Ds drew Viet Cong fire while landing a 112-man Vietnamese unit in the hills 10 miles (20 km) west-southwest of Tam Ky. On 26 October, the Blue Knights suffered their first combat casualties when a copilot and crew chief were wounded by Viet Cong small arms fire while their helicopter was approaching an enemy contested landing zone 10 miles (20 km) southwest of Tam Ky. The pilot was able to return the damaged aircraft to Tam Ky and land safely. In early November, at the height of the monsoon season, Typhoon Iris struck the Vietnamese Coast. The hazardous weather conditions caused flight operations to be suspended except for emergency medical evacuations. When flight operations resumed on 10 November, the crews concentrated on rescuing Vietnamese civilians from the inundated coastal plains. Between 1700 and 1900 on their first day of flood relief operations, HMM-365 rescued 144 flood victims. Many of the rescues were accomplished by hoisting individuals from precarious positions in trees or on rooftops while being subjected to sporadic Viet Cong harassing fire. At the end of a 72-hour time period the Blue Knights had successfully rescued over 1,500 flood victims.

Meanwhile, other squadron members were modifying three helicopters to carry a new weapons system. The TK-1, an externally mounted combination of M-60 machine guns and 2.75-inch (70 mm) rocket launchers, that was first used in support of a Tiger Flight mission conducted just south of the Song Thu Bon, about 17 miles (27 km) from Da Nang. Two armed UH-34Ds expended 90 rockets and 500 rounds of 7.62 mm ammunition on enemy positions during pre-landing strikes. The squadron executed similar operations the following day.

The squadron remained at Da Nang until February 1965. They embarked aboard the USS Princeton on 7 March 1965 to support the 7th Fleet's Special Landing Force until 27 April. HMM-365 returned to Da Nang on 15 May and remained until relieved in August 1965. The squadron flew over 12,000 mishap-free hours in support of heavy combat operations. On 1 September, HMM-365 was reassigned to Marine Aircraft Group 26, MCAS New River, North Carolina. For its service in Vietnam, the squadron was awarded the Presidential Unit Citation and the Navy Unit Commendation.

In 1966, the squadron conducted relief operations in the Dominican Republic and Haiti following Hurricane Inez. In March 1967, HMM-365 received its first CH-46 Sea Knight . The transition was complete by late June. In January 1970, the squadron received eight new CH-46D aircraft in preparation for its upcoming deployment to the Caribbean. That June, the squadron flew disaster relief operations in Peru following an earthquake. On 1 March 1971, HMM-365 was deactivated.

=== 1980s ===
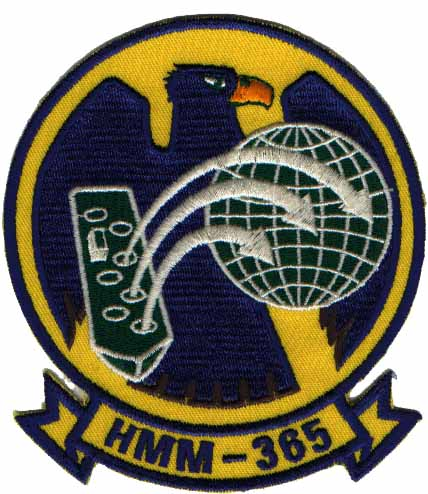
Old squadron insignia

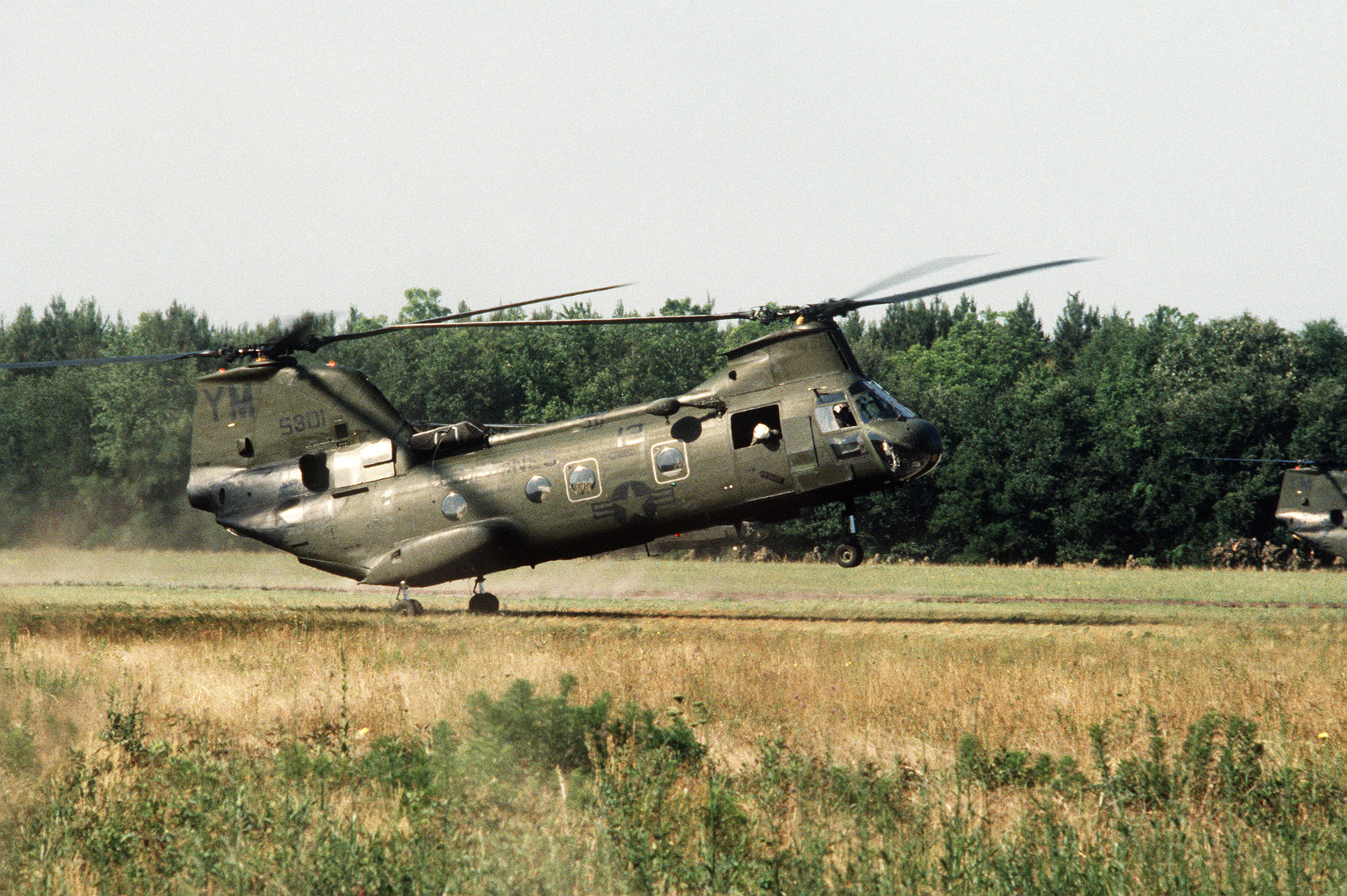
An HMM-365 CH-46E landing at MCAS Beaufort, 1985.

HMM-365 was reactivated on 13 June 1980 and equipped with the new CH-46E helicopter. In May 1983 the squadron was reassigned to Marine Aircraft Group 29. In 1984, HMM-365 became the first tactical helicopter squadron to achieve 75,000 mishap-free flight hours. In April 1989, HMM-365 began its second deployment as the Aviation Combat Element for the 24th Marine Expeditionary Unit.

=== 1990s ===
Four months later, after the Iraqi invasion of Kuwait, HMM-365 embarked aboard the USS Guam for Operation Desert Shield. On 6 January 1991, while en route to Iraq, HMM-365 and HMM-263 conducted Operation Eastern Exit, the Non-combatant Evacuation (NEO) of the American Embassy in Mogadishu, Somalia. The NEO was successful with 281 American and foreign nationals being safely evacuated.

Operation Desert Storm began on 17 February. On 26 February the Blue Knights conducted a night time, long-range mission in support of the amphibious demonstration against Bubiyan Island. A cease-fire went into effect on 28 February, and the Blue Knights returned to MCAS New River.

While deployed in 1992, the Amphibious Ready Group moved into the Adriatic Sea to support Operation Provide Promise. On 3 September, while on station near the coast, the Blue Knights launched a Tactical Recovery of Aircraft and personnel (TRAP) mission into Yugoslavia following the downing of an Italian cargo aircraft carrying relief supplies into Sarajevo.

In April 1994, the squadron deployed aboard the USS Guam as the ACE for the 26th Marine Expeditionary Unit. During this deployment, the squadron participated in the 50th anniversary commemoration of D-Day in the English Channel. President Clinton was flown on squadron aircraft, as well as the Commandant of the Marine Corps, during the ceremonies. The squadron was later used for stand-by in the area near Somalia as American troops were withdrawn. The squadron then supported operations in the Adriatic Sea.

In 1995, the squadron was presented with the Marine Corps Aviation Association (MCAA) Edward C. Dyer Marine Medium Helicopter Squadron of the Year Award.

The squadron departed for its 1997 deployment aboard the USS Nassau on 23 November 1996. During the deployment, the Blue Knights supported Operation Decisive Endeavor in Bosnia-Herzegovina and Operation Silver Wake, the Non-combatant Evacuation of the American Embassy in Tirana, Albania. During Silver Wake, the squadron successfully evacuated 851 Americans and third country nationals. Once again, the squadron received the 1997 MCAA Edward C. Dyer Marine Medium Helicopter Squadron of the Year Award.

In 1999, the Blue Knights supported Operation Noble Anvil and Operation Shining Hope in the Kosovo War and based aircraft ashore at Skopje, Macedonia from June to July in order to support NATO’s peacekeeping and humanitarian assistance missions. In September, the 26th Marine Expeditionary Unit was ordered to support earthquake relief operations in Turkey. HMM-365 flew rescue and surveyor teams during Operation Avid Response.

=== The Global War on Terror ===
Following the September 11, 2001 attacks, the Blue Knights prepared for immediate departure. The 26th MEU set sail 20 September. The MEU transited to a position off the coast of Pakistan to begin combat operations in support of Operation Enduring Freedom. HMM-365(REIN), in concert with HMM-163(REIN), launched 6 CH-53Es to secure Camp Rhino, nearly 800 nautical miles (1,500 km) inland. After securing both Camp Rhino and Kandahar Airport deep in Afghanistan, the Blue Knights supported coalition forces conducting raids against the Taliban from December 2001 to February 2002. In March, the ARG transited to the Red Sea for a potential NEO in Yemen and to support Vice President Dick Cheney’s visit to the region.

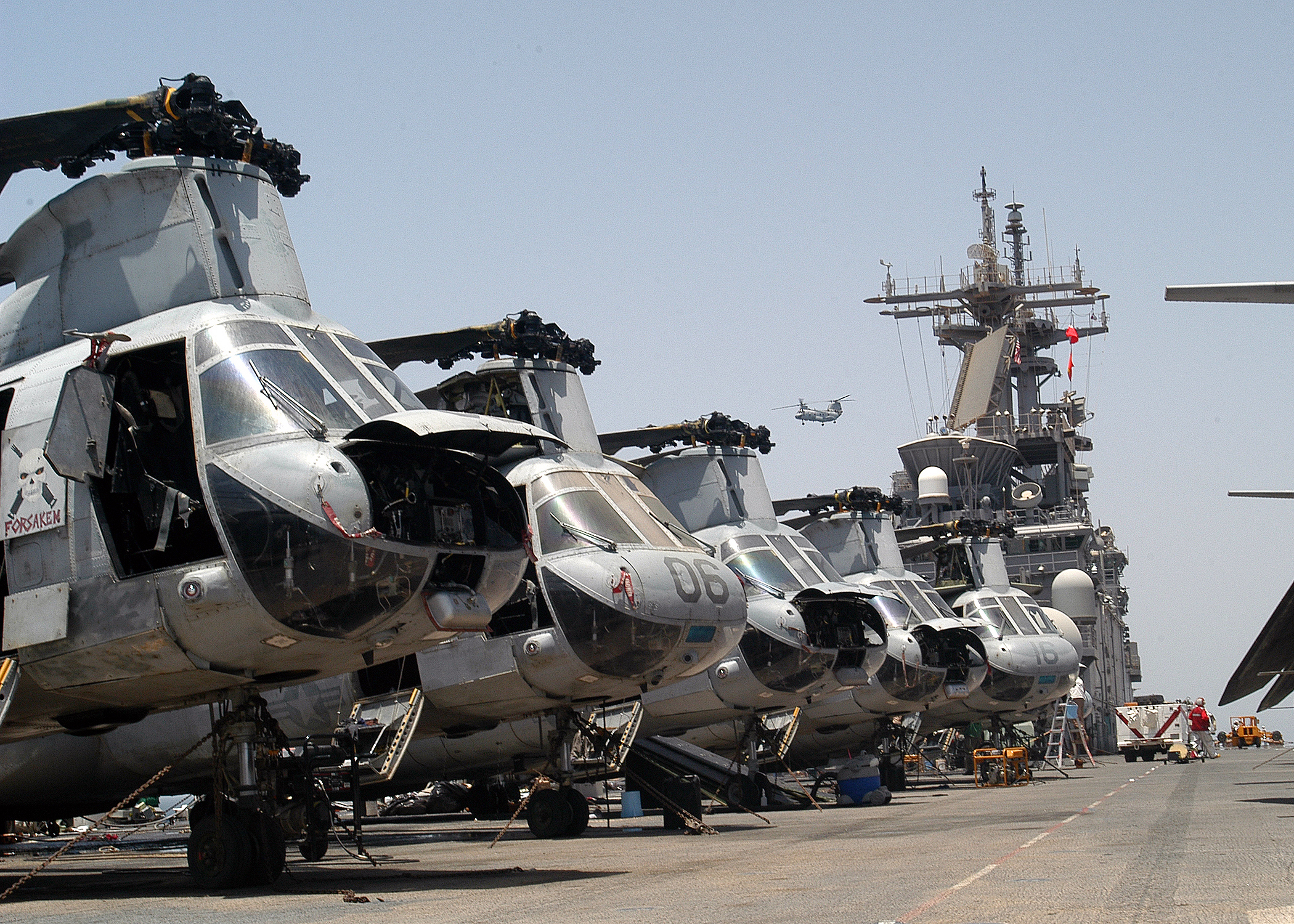
HMM-365 CH-46Es on USS Kearsarge (LHD-3), 2003.

In January 2003, the Blue Knights prepared for deployment to Ali Al Salem Airbase, Kuwait in support of Operation Iraqi Freedom (OIF). OIF began on 20 March, with HMM-365 leading the TRAP Team effort for the initial heliborne raids on the crucial Al Faw Peninsula. From 20 March until 1 May, the squadron provided CASEVAC and assault support to I Marine Expeditionary Force (I MEF), the 24th MEU, the 15th MEU, Task Force Tarawa, and United Nations forces. Blue Knight crews flew multiple raids and recon inserts as ground forces maneuvered north towards Baghdad. Due to the expeditious nature of I MEF's battle rhythm, section detachments were configured into combat crews and pushed forward with coalition forces in order to provide 24-hour support. Blue Knight aircrews flew 200 to 300-mile (500 km) missions across the Kuwaiti border, into Iraq, to conduct relief operations with other sections for up to a week at a time. The squadron supported I MEF operations from Ali Al Salem until mid-April when it re-deployed itself in a single day to Jalibah FOB, Iraq where it rejoined MAG-29. The squadron conducted flight operations from Iraq until 10 May, when the squadron embarked aboard USS Kearsarge. After supporting the President's visit to Egypt and Jordan, the USS Kearsarge transited to Liberia for possible NEO operations. The Blue Knights returned to New River on 28 June 2003.

On 7 August 2004, HMM-365's main body departed New River, NC for Al Asad Air Base, Iraq. On 21 August, the squadron assumed the assault support mission from HMM-261.

On 25 November, the Blue Knights flew the Secretary of the Navy, the honorable Gordon R. England. On 13 and 14 December the squadron flew the Commandant of the Marine Corps, General Michael Hagee, to Al Taqaddum and Fallujah. On 23 February 2005, HMM-365 returned to CONUS after flying more than 3,961 combat hours, 2,404 sorties, 11,162 passengers, and 748,496 pounds of cargo without the loss of aircraft or personnel.

In August 2005, in the wake of the devastation caused by Hurricane Katrina, the Blue Knights dispatched two aircraft and personnel to the Gulf Coast of the United States to conduct search-and-rescue and disaster relief operations in support of JTF Katrina. Later that year on 2 November 2005, the squadron had the first CH-46E Sea Knight to be retired and stored in the Boneyard at Davis-Monthan Air Force Base some 41 years after the first CH-46 entered the fleet.

In May 2006, the squadron deployed aboard the USS Iwo Jima as the ACE for the 24th Marine Expeditionary Unit. While conducting training operations in Jordan, the squadron was ordered to the coast of Beirut for Non-Combatant Evacuation operations at the American Embassy in Beirut. Also during this deployment, the squadron conducted training in Kuwait for two weeks. Squadron aircraft also supported operations in the Horn of Africa.

In April 2008, HMM-365(REIN) deployed as the aviation combat element of the 24th MEU. The MEU was subsequently sent into Afghanistan as part of Operation Enduring Freedom where their aircraft have been spread out and based out of Kandahar Airfield and Camps Bastion and Dwyer which are over 100 miles away. During the course of this deployment they have been tasked with supporting the MEU and also the International Security Assistance Force (ISAF) and local Afghan forces. They logged over 3,000 combat sorties during this deployment.

The squadron was redesignated as Marine Medium Tiltrotor Squadron 365 on 15 January 2009 after completing their conversion to the MV-22 Osprey. VMM-365 is the fifth squadron aboard MCAS New River to transition to the Osprey.

In January 2012, only eleven months after returning from a successful deployment to Afghanistan, VMM-365 returned to Camp Bastion to conduct combat operations in support of Operation Enduring Freedom. During the month of April, the squadron conducted 35 Named Operations and increased that number to 39 in May and 42 in June. VMM-365 flew in support of 193 Named Operations over the course of the seven-month deployment. By comparison, the squadron conducted just 10 Named Operations during OEF 10.2. In addition to successfully supporting an average of one Named Operation per day, the squadron moved 36,047 passengers and 769,102 pounds of cargo across the battle space while conducting General Support missions.

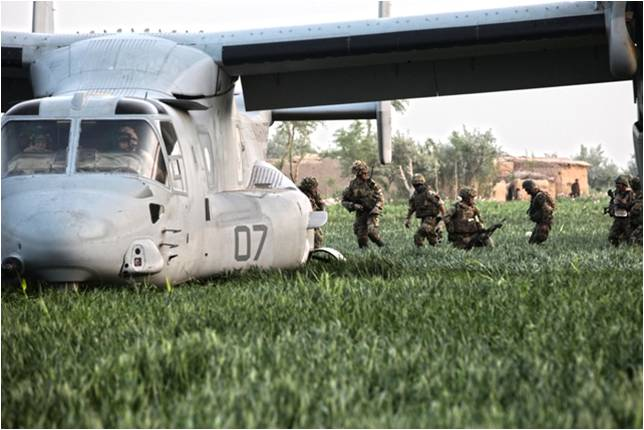
VMM-365 in Afghanistan 2012

The squadron expanded the accepted capabilities of the MV-22 by operating across the spectrum of Assault Support and displaying wide-ranging and flexible skill sets. Centering on the primary mission of a VMM, the Blue Knights conducted conventional insertion/extraction operations, narcotic raids, Aerial Reaction Forces, and Aerial Interdiction. On 25 March 2012, a flight of six Blue Knight Ospreys conducted the largest tiltrotor-borne insert in history by inserting 594 coalition personnel in support of Operation JAWS. VMM-365 also launched flights of three or more aircraft on 48 different occasions, to include 17 flights of five or more aircraft.

The maintenance department's Emergency Reclamation Team was tested on several occasions; to include, 27 June 2012 when two separate aircraft received significant battle damage after inserting 1st Reconnaissance Battalion Marines to a tactical landing zone. One of these aircraft was forced to make an emergency landing to a nearby FOB after taking 12 enemy medium machine gun rounds. Less than 18 hours later, VMM-365 fixed the damaged aircraft and flew safely back to Camp Bastion. Throughout the deployment, the Blue Knights were engaged by enemy fire 26 times, returned fire 12 times, and sustained battle damage to five aircraft.

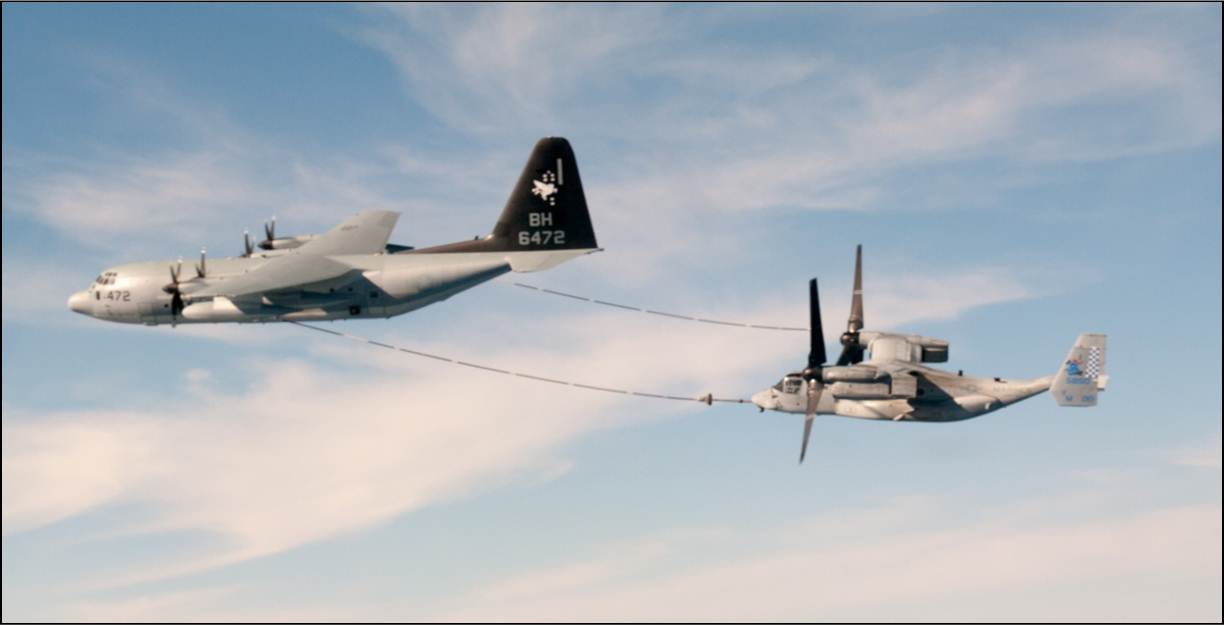
VMM-365 aerial refueling during SPMAGTF-CR 2013

Six of the squadron's MV-22Bs self-deployed to Morón Air Base on 27 April 2013, as part of the Special Purpose Marine Air Ground Task Force–Crisis Response.

On 27 May 2014 VMM-365 went composite with HMLA-269, HMH-461, MWSS-272, MACG-28, MALS-26 and MALS-29 and was redesignated VMM-365(REIN) in support of 24th Marine Expeditionary Unit. Three months later, VMA-231 and MALS-14 joined the ACE resulting in more than 500 Marines and sailors attached to VMM-365(REIN). Of the 29 aircraft assigned, the ACE can employ (12) MV-22B, (4) CH-53E, (4) AH-1W, (3) UH-1Y, and (6) AV-8B. Additionally the ACE can employ multiple Low Altitude Air Defense teams and aircraft controllers. On 12 December 2014 VMM-365(REIN) deployed with 24 MEU, Amphibious Squadron 8 and the USS Iwo Jima Amphibious Readiness Group.

On 16 July 2015 VMM-365(REIN) returned from deployment with 24th Marine Expeditionary Unit. The Blue Knights expertly stood the alert, ready to respond. The ACE supported multiple bilateral exercises in 6th and 5th Fleet areas of responsibility, conducted combat missions in Iraq in support of Operation INHERENT RESOLVE, assisted with the evacuation of US Embassies in Yemen in both Sana'a and Aden, supported multiple US Ambassador visits to Aden, Yemen, and served as an airborne deterrence force against surface ships delivering lethal weapons to Huthi rebels in Yemen. In the seven-month deployment, the squadron flew more than 3,500 hours and maintained the highest overall aircraft readiness rate of any Aviation Combat Element since deploying with the MV-22B Osprey.

=== War on the Cartels ===
As a part of the 24th Marine Expeditionary Unit VMM-365 was deployed to the SOUTHCOM area of responsibility in June of 2026. In August and September of 2026 the squadron’s UH-1Y Super Hueys would provide overwatch for Marine Corps boarding parties as a part of their campaign against Los Choneros drug smuggling refueling boats.

== See also ==
- United States Marine Corps Aviation
- List of active United States Marine Corps aircraft squadrons
