= Operation Noble Obelisk =

1997 United States military operation

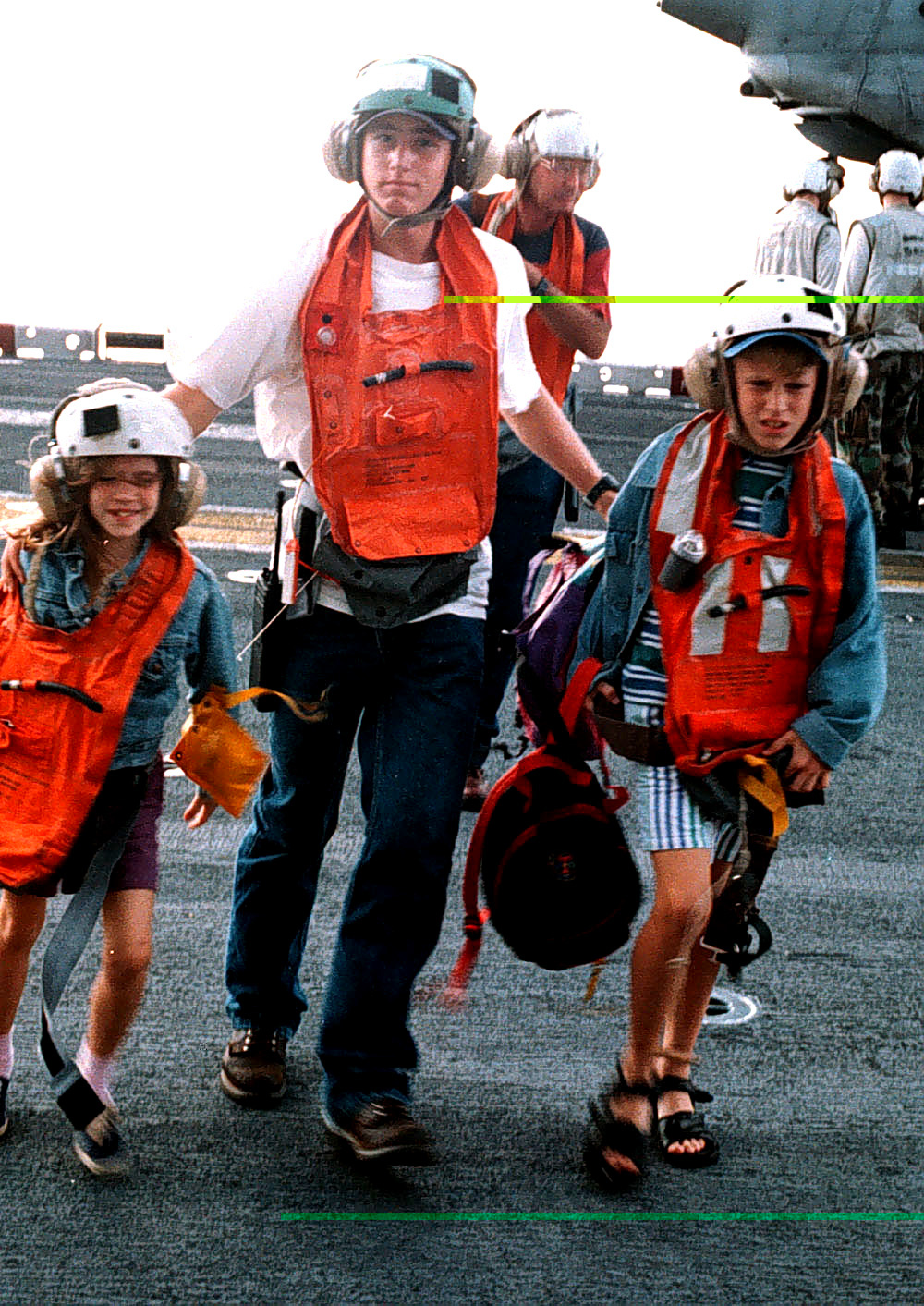
Evacuees from Freetown

Operation Noble Obelisk was the U.S. evacuation of civilians from Sierra Leone in 1997 by the American naval ship USS Kearsarge (LHD-3) and the 22nd Marine Expeditionary Unit.

On the 25 May 1997, rebel forces and military officers overthrew the government of President Ahmed Tejan Kabbah of Sierra Leone. At that time, a U.S. Army Special Forces detachment was deployed in Sierra Leone for joint training exercises.

After the coup d'etat, the Special Forces moved to Freetown to secure the U.S. Embassy and its two residential compounds. The detachment also identified an appropriate location for a helicopter landing zone near the embassy. (HLZ). The Special Forces also provided the Marine Expeditionary commander with "real-time" intelligence on conditions in Freetown. Major General Samuel T. Helland was designated as Commander, Joint Task Force Noble Obelisk.

US forces evacuated 2509 people to the Kearsarge over a four-day period. The evacuees included 454 American citizens and third-country nationals.

The Marine 1st Battalion, 2nd Regiment out of Camp Lejeune, North Carolina participated in the Noncombatants Evacuation Operation (NEO), as well as Marine Medium Helicopter Squadron 261. Naval Air Reservists from VR-52 Taskmasters (CDR. Dave Delancy, LT. CDR. Tim Kaseno, AT2 Mike Merrill-Crew Chief, AD2 Frank Farkas - Loadmaster, AMH2 John E. Dilts - LM2) out of Willow Grove, PA provided logistical support.
