= Operation Provide Promise =

1992–96 humanitarian airlift of the Yugoslav Wars

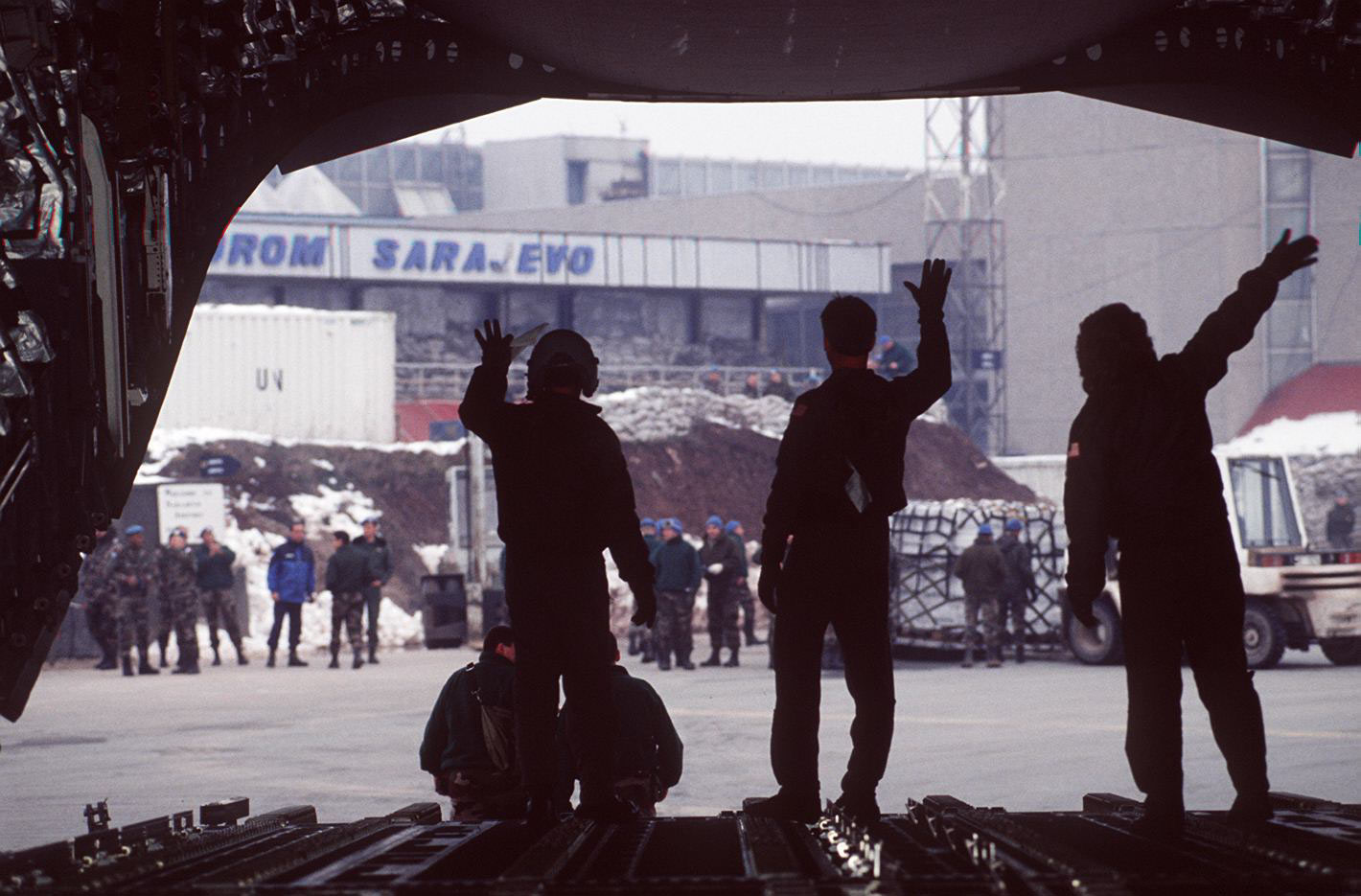
U.S. Air Force C-17 Globemaster III crew members at the airport in Sarajevo, Bosnia-Herzegovina, as part of the operation

Operation Provide Promise was a humanitarian relief operation in Bosnia and Herzegovina during the Yugoslav Wars, from 2 July 1992, to 9 January 1996, which made it the longest running humanitarian airlift in history.

By the end of the operation, aircraft from 21 countries had flown 12,886 sorties into Sarajevo, delivering 159,622 tons of food, medicine, and supplies and evacuating over 1,300 wounded people. The US flew 3,951 C-130, 236 C-141, and 10 C-17 airland sorties (delivering 62,801.5 tons), as well as 2,222 C-130 air-drop sorties.

There were 260 incidents, including the shooting down of an Italian Air Force plane in September 1992, which killed all four crew on board.

== See also ==
- Siege of Sarajevo

== Notes ==
Operation: Provide Promise was not a humanitarian relief effort until at a much later time when hostility in the nearby regions diminished. The Operation became a Task-Force to support. For the Air Force, humanitarian drops were dispatched, but for the army, security and medical units were in support of UN troops deployed in the region.
