= Assault Support =

One of the six functions of U.S. Marine Corps Aviation

Assault Support is one of the six functions of United States Marine Corps aviation and comprises those actions required to airlift personnel, supplies or equipment into or within a battle area by helicopters or fixed-wing aircraft. It provides the Marine Air-Ground Task Force commander the ability to concentrate his strength against selected weaknesses using speed and surprise. It also provides operational and tactical mobility as well as logistics support to the Marine Air-Ground Task Force. It is used to focus combat power at the decisive place and time to achieve local combat superiority.

== 7 categories of assault support ==
- Combat Assault Transport - provides mobility for the Marine Air-Ground Task Force. It is used to rapidly deploy forces, bypass obstacles or redeploy forces to meet the enemy threat. All of these actions provide the Marine Air-Ground Task Force commander with more diverse options for operational planning. Combat assault transport allow the commander to effect a rapid force build-up at a specific time and place of his choosing.
- Aerial Delivery -
- Aerial Refueling -
- Air Evacuation – is the transportation of personnel and equipment from a forward operating base or remote areas. This includes flights from areas of operations to secure areas, casualty evacuation, and extraction of forces.
- Tactical Recovery of Aircraft and Personnel – the recovery of personnel and equipment while avoiding additional loss.
- Air Logistical Support – is performed by fixed-wing aircraft and delivers troops, equipment and supplies to areas beyond helicopter range and lift capability or when surface transportation is slow or unavailable.
- Battlefield Illumination -

== Mission categories ==
- Preplanned Missions – provide the most economical and efficient use of assets. These missions are requested far enough in advance to allow coordination between the requestor, the supporting unit and fire support/command and control agencies.
  - Scheduled Missions – missions requested in advance that permit detailed mission planning and close coordination with the appropriate Marine Air-Ground Task Force elements.
  - On Call Missions – assets are positioned close enough to provide a timely response when called needed.
- Immediate Missions – those missions which suddenly arise and cannot be planned. They can be launched in support of any requesting unit. Immediate requests will be routed through the Direct Air Support Center and fulfilled based on the commander's priorities.

== Asset allocation ==
Asset allocations will be determined by aircraft availability, lift requirements, aircraft capabilities, threat analysis, escort and fire support requirements, time, space and logistics requirements and unit proficiency level.
