= Ricky Buria =

Colonel Ricky Buria is an American public official. Since 2025 he has served as chief of staff to U.S. Secretary of Defense Pete Hegseth.

== Early life and education ==
Buria is a graduate of the U.S. Naval Academy and Marshall University.

== Military service and political career ==
After enlisting in the U.S. Marine Corps, Buria deployed to both Iraq and Afghanistan. As of 2022, Buria was Commanding Officer of VMM-362 in Miramar, California.

From 2023 to 2024, Buria served as a Fellow in the Secretary of Defense Strategic Thinkers Program at Johns Hopkins University.

Buria joined the Department of Defense staff as a junior military aide to Secretary Lloyd Austin in April 2024. Buria remained at the Department of Defense after the Biden administration ended in January 2025 and continued to serve in a military aide role under Secretary Pete Hegseth. Buria assumed the duties of acting senior military assistant in February 2025, a role usually reserved for high-ranking military officials. In addition to fulfilling the traditional "body man" duties that the military aide assumes, Buria began advising Hegseth on policy and administrative matters; Buria reportedly helped Hegseth gain access to freer means of communication on his personal devices, including Signal, the messaging app on which Hegseth shared classified information in a group text.

In April 2025, Buria resigned from his post in the U.S. Marine Corps to assume a role as a political appointee at the Department of Defense, receiving a waiver from the White House to begin work in a political role more quickly than would generally be allowable under federal law. Public reporting indicated that the White House did not approve of Buria taking the chief of staff role at the Pentagon, namely because of his ties to the Biden administration. Buria is also linked to the pattern of Hegseth denying promotions to female officers and people of color at the department. Buria was ultimately named chief of staff in December 2025.
