= VMM-163 =

Marine Medium Tiltrotor Squadron 163
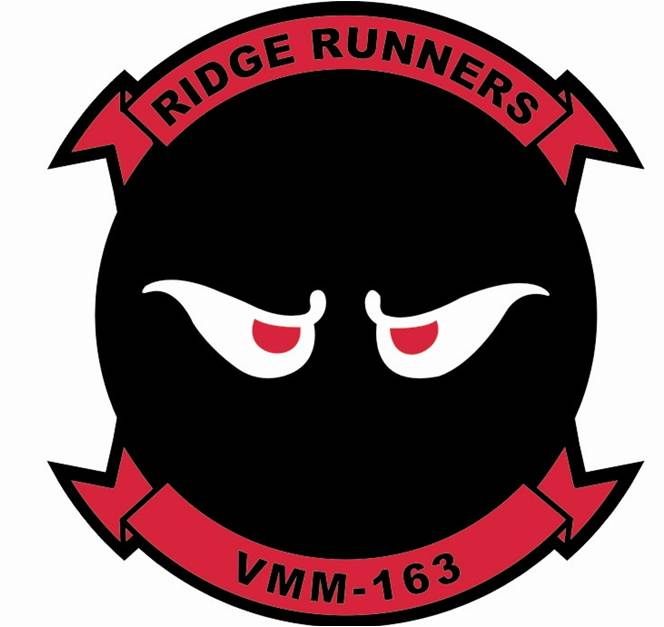
- VMM-163 Insignia
- Active: December 1951 - present
- Country: United States
- Allegiance: United States of America
- Branch: United States Marine Corps
- Type: Medium Lift Tiltrotor Squadron
- Role: Assault Support
- Part of: Marine Aircraft Group 16; 3rd Marine Aircraft Wing
- Garrison/HQ: Marine Corps Air Station Miramar
- Nickname(s): "Evil Eyes" "Ridge Runners" (1953-2015)
- Tail Code: YP
- Engagements: Vietnam War * Battle of A Shau; Operation Enduring Freedom; Operation Iraqi Freedom

Commanders
- Current commander: LtCol James D. Whitlow

Aircraft flown
- CH-34; CH-46; MV-22B Osprey

Marine Medium Tiltrotor Squadron 163 (VMM-163) is a United States Marine Corps helicopter squadron consisting of MV-22 Osprey transport tiltrotors. The squadron, known as "Evil Eyes", is based at Marine Corps Air Station Miramar, California and falls under the command of Marine Aircraft Group 16 (MAG-16) and the 3rd Marine Aircraft Wing (3rd MAW).

The Squadron's original nickname, the "Ridge Runners", was bestowed as a result of typhoon rescue and relief operations in the mountainous terrain surrounding Hanshin, Japan following Typhoon Tess in September 1953. In 2015, the squadron officially adopted the moniker "Evil Eyes." This comes from the eyes that have been painted on squadron aircraft since October 1965 when it was recommended by the squadron's intelligence officer for operation in South Vietnam.

== Mission ==
Provide assault support transport of combat troops, supplies and equipment during expeditionary, joint or combined operations. Be prepared for short-notice, worldwide deployment in support of Marine Air-Ground Task Force operations.

== History ==
=== The Early years ===
Marine Helicopter Transport Squadron 163 (HMR-163) was commissioned on December 1, 1951, at Marine Corps Air Station Santa Ana, California. In March 1952 the squadron joined Marine Aircraft Group 16 (MAG-16) at MCAF Futema. In September 1953, the squadron embarked on the USS Bataan (CVL-29) sailing for Japan. During October 1953 the squadron flew humanitarian relief missions in the area of Hanshin following devastation created by Typhoon Tess. It was during this operation that the squadron gained its nickname, "The Ridgerunners." In August 1954, the squadron sent a three-helicopter detachment aboard ship to assist with the relocation of Vietnamese refugees as part of Operation Passage to Freedom. During this deployment, the squadron's helicopters delivered many people to Dr Thomas Dooley's clinic north of the 17th parallel. On December 1, 1956, the squadron was redesignated as Marine Helicopter Transport Squadron (Light) 163 (HMR(L)-163).

HMR-163 returned to the United States in May 1959 and was reassigned to Marine Aircraft Group 36 at MCAS Santa Ana, CA. In June 1960, the squadron again deployed to MCAF Futema, Okinawa, Japan returning to MCAS Santa Ana in August 1961. The squadron designation was changed again to Marine Medium Helicopter Squadron 163 (HMM-163) on February 1, 1962. HMM-163 returned to MCAF Futema in July 1962.

=== Vietnam War ===
In late July 1962, HMM-163 deployed to Sóc Trăng Airfield, South Vietnam and on 1 August it replaced HMM-362 as the Operation Shufly squadron. In early September 1962, HMM-163 began redeploying with its support units from Marine Aircraft Group 16 (MAG-16) to Da Nang Air Base, completing the redeployment by 20 September. On 6 October the squadron suffered its first fatalities when a search and rescue UH-34 crashed due to mechanical failure 15 miles (24 km) southwest of Tam Kỳ killing five Marines and two Navy corpsmen with only the pilot surviving. On 11 January 1963 HMM-162 replaced the squadron, during their time in South Vietnam the squadron's crews had flown a total of 10,869 hours, 15,200 sorties and had lifted over 25,216 combat assault troops and 59,024 other passengers.

The squadron redeployed to South Vietnam as the Shufly squadron at Da Nang Air Base on 17 February 1965 replacing HMM-365 and was there when the 9th Marine Expeditionary Brigade landed at Red Beach on 8 March 1965. On 31 March the squadron supported the Army of the Republic of Vietnam (ARVN) Operation Quyet Thang 512 flying Airborne troops from Tam Kỳ to a landing zone 25 miles (40 km) south of Da Nang, during the operation one UH-34 was shot down and two Marines killed. The mission was depicted in Larry Burrows' LIFE magazine photo-essay "One ride with Yankee Papa 13" showing the death of Marine pilot 1st Lt James E. Magel and the rescue of wounded gunner Sgt Billie Owens. For most U.S. citizens, this was the first time they were made aware of the extent of America's involvement in Vietnam. On 21 June the squadron was replaced by HMM-261 and joined the Special Landing Force (SLF) onboard USS Iwo Jima. The squadron then supported Operation Starlite landing the 3rd Battalion 7th Marines. In September the squadron supported Operation Dagger Thrust. On 11 October HMM-261 replaced the squadron as the SLF helicopter squadron.

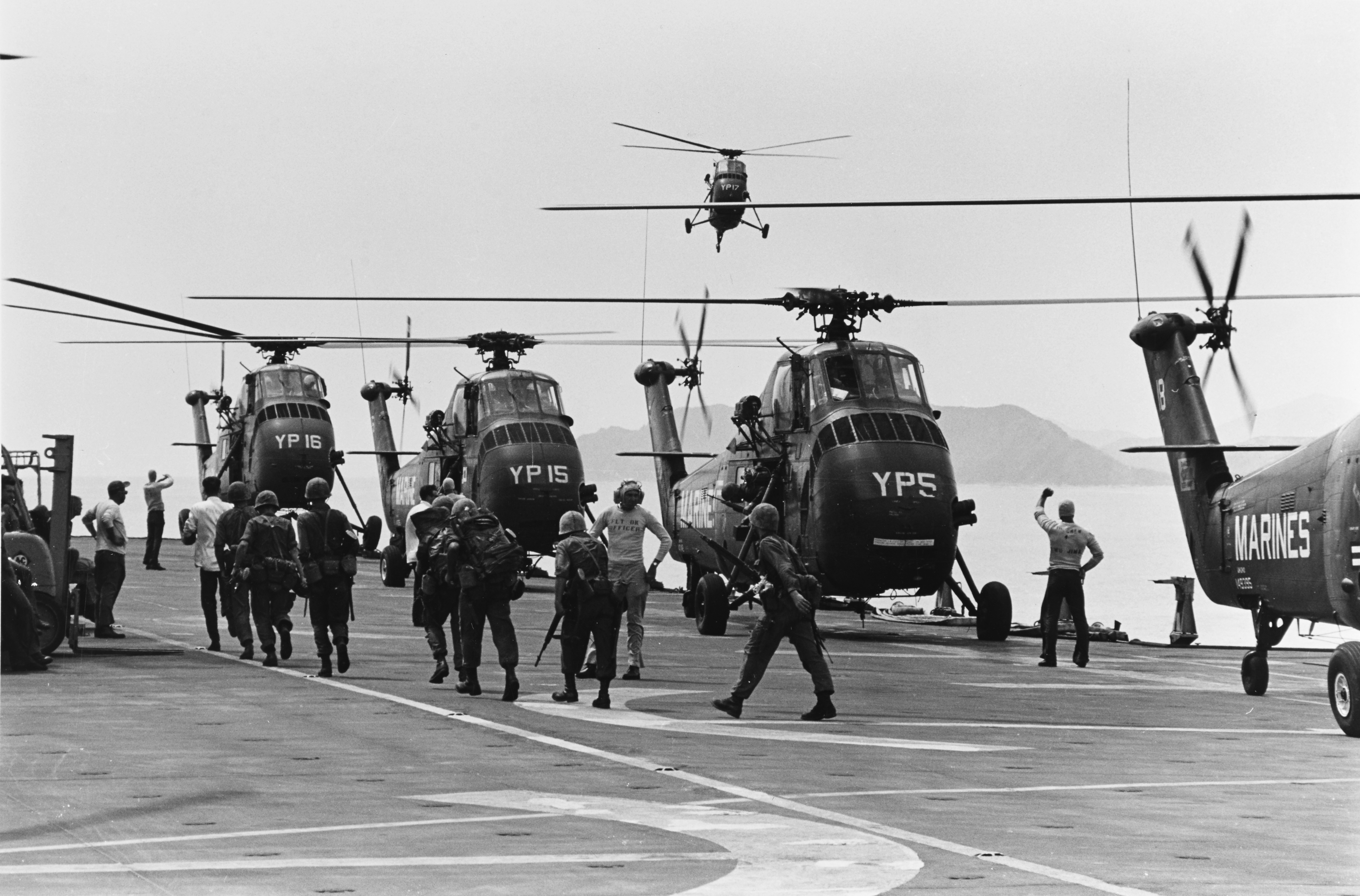
Squadron helicopters on USS Iwo Jima during Operation Dagger Thrust

In late October 1965, HMM-163 relocated to Marine Corps Air Station Futenma, Okinawa, Japan. Captain Al Barbes, the Squadron Intelligence Officer and husband to a Filipina bride, offered a suggestion. Because of Asian culture and beliefs, he proposed that eyes painted on the unit aircraft might have an unsettling effect upon the enemy, thus the concept of "The Eyes" on the front of HMM-163 aircraft was born.

On 1 January 1966, HMM-163 flew to Phu Bai Combat Base, South Vietnam, relieved HMM-161, and took over all their H-34 helicopters. Painting of what were then called "Genie Eyes" (after the I Dream of Jeannie TV show) began immediately. By March 1966, HMM-163's "Genie Eyes" were being called "Evil Eyes" by the ground units supported.

From 26 February to 3 March the squadron supported Operation New York. On 9 March 1966, the People's Army of Vietnam (PAVN) 95th Regiment, 325th Division attacked the Special Forces camp in the A Shau Valley about 30 miles (48 km) southwest of Huế in Thừa Thiên Province. Defending the camp were 10 Green Berets and 210 South Vietnamese Civilian Irregular Defense Group. The squadron flew over 2,000 flight hours in ten days during the battle in which 190 survivors were rescued from capture in the face of heavy enemy anti-aircraft fire. During the battle, 21 of the 24 aircraft assigned to the squadron suffered "major damage" including two that were shot down.

The squadron supported Operation Oregon from 19–23 March. It then supported Operation Texas in which one UH-34 was shot down by Vietcong (VC) antiaircraft fire killing three crewmen and seven Marines from 3rd Battalion 1st Marines. In mid-April the squadron supported Operation Virginia around Khe Sanh Combat Base. The squadron left South Vietnam on 1 August 1966 and joined Task Group 79.2 from 2 to 28 October and returned to South Vietnam on 1 November 1966.

The squadron again returned to Phu Bai, still with black and white "Evil Eyes", under the command of LtCol Otto Bianchi. Bianchi was a good friend of the Wing Commander, but that didn't keep Major General Louis Robertshaw, 1st MAW Commanding General, from reading Bianchi the "riot act" concerning the unauthorized paint scheme. Also in the room at the time of this conversation was the Commanding General of the Marine ground forces in the area, who politely interrupted by saying, "It sure is great to have the 'Evil Eyes' back here at Phu Bai!" Robertshaw relented and the "Evil Eyes" have remained to this day.

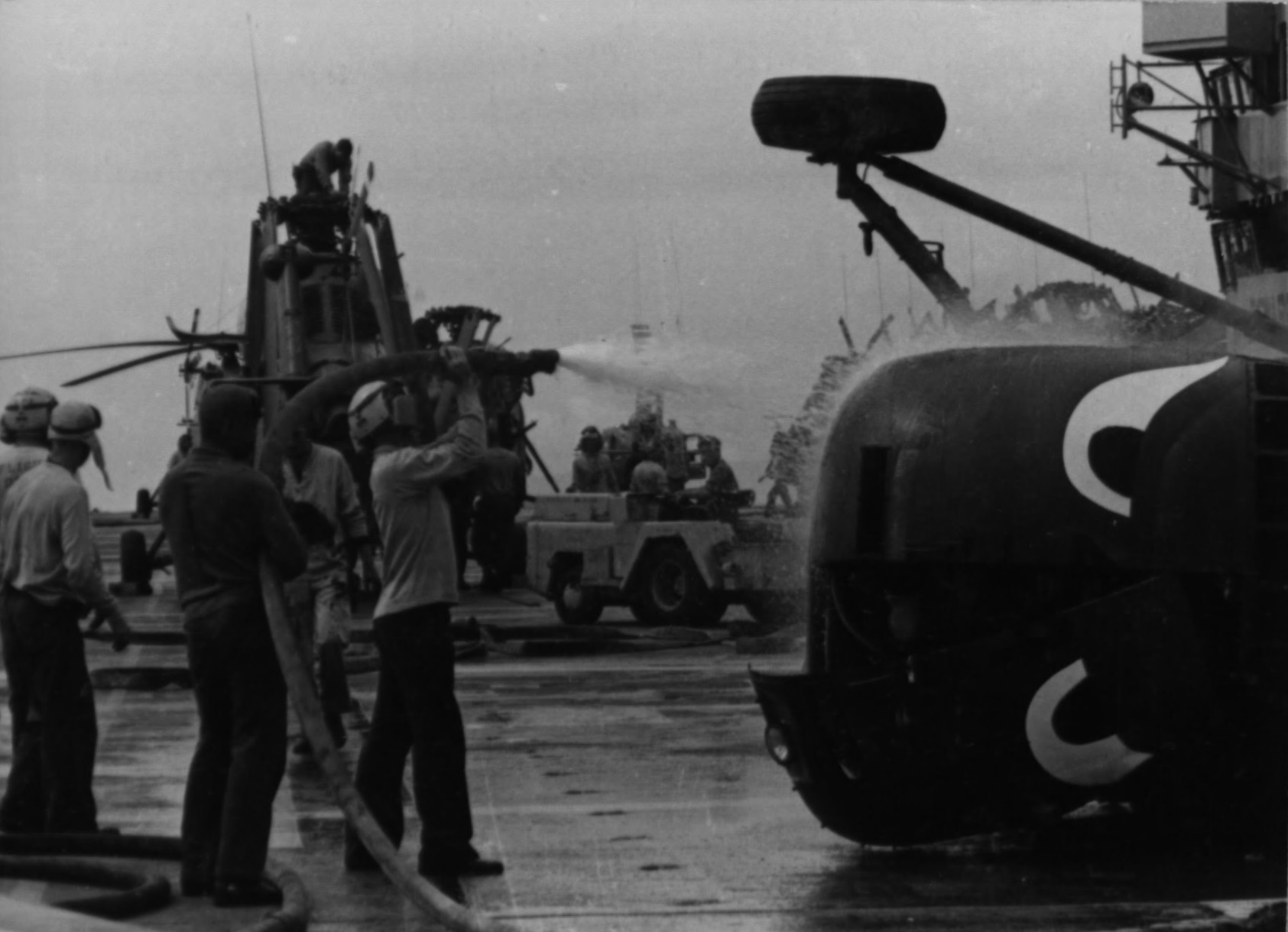
Crashed squadron UH-34 on USS Okinawa, October 1967

On 8 September 1967 the squadron became the SLF Alpha helicopter squadron onboard USS Okinawa. On 30 October the squadron joined Marine Aircraft Group 36 (MAG-36) at Quang Tri Combat Base.

The squadron supported Marine units fighting around the Vietnamese Demilitarized Zone throughout early 1968. In mid-April the MAG-36 units at Quang Tri, including the squadron, were detached into Provisional (Prov) MAG-39. On 19 May HMM-161 equipped with new CH-46Ds replaced the squadron at Quang Tri and it was transferred to MAG-16. On 31 August the squadron returned to the U.S.

=== 1990s ===
During the 1990s, HMM-163 continued to excel while serving as the Aviation Combat Element (ACE) for five Special Operations Capable Marine Expeditionary Units (MEU(SOC)) on deployments to the Pacific and Central Command theaters. During this time, the squadron participated in operations across the Pacific and from the Horn of Africa to the Persian Gulf, including Operation Fiery Vigil in 1991, Operation Continue Hope, Operation Distant Runner, and Operation Quick Draw in 1994, Operation Desert Strike in 1996 and Operation Resolute Response in 1998.

== Global War on Terror ==
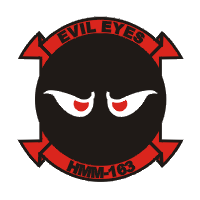
Alternate squadron patch picturing the evil eyes

In 2001, while deployed with the 15th Marine Expeditionary Unit(SOC), the Evil Eyes of HMM-163 again had the opportunity to serve America with distinction by participating in combat operations in support of Operation Enduring Freedom. While forward deployed to the Central Command Theater of Operations, the Evil Eyes planned and executed the longest amphibious assault in American military history with the seizure of a Forward Operating Base (FOB) in southern Afghanistan. This was accomplished through the use of a 4-aircraft detachment of CH-53E helicopters, which are capable of in-flight refueling. They had been attached to the squadron 8 months earlier in preparation for deployment as the Air Combat Element of the 15th MEU (SOC). The squadron remained forward deployed for seven weeks operating from the austere base in support of Task Force 58 and other coalition Special Operations Forces.

In 2003, the Evil Eyes deployed from 22 August 2003 to 8 March 2004 with the 13th Marine Expeditionary Unit. Again, the squadron made history by being part of the first Expeditionary Strike Group One (ESG-1). The ESG concept focused on combining surface action groups and submarines with traditional Amphibious Ready Groups (ARGs) and MEUs to offer theater combatant commanders more flexibility and capabilities. During this deployment HMM-163 participated in security operation in the southern Iraqi city of Basrah in support of Operation Iraqi Freedom.

== Awards ==
- HMM-163 received the Chief of Naval Operations Aviation Safety Awards in 1980, 1982, 1983, 1984, 1985, 1989, and 1996.
- Meritorious Unit Commendations (MUC) with one Gold Star
- Named the MCAA Helicopter squadron of the Year in 1979, 1981, 1985, 1990, and 2002.

== Gallery ==
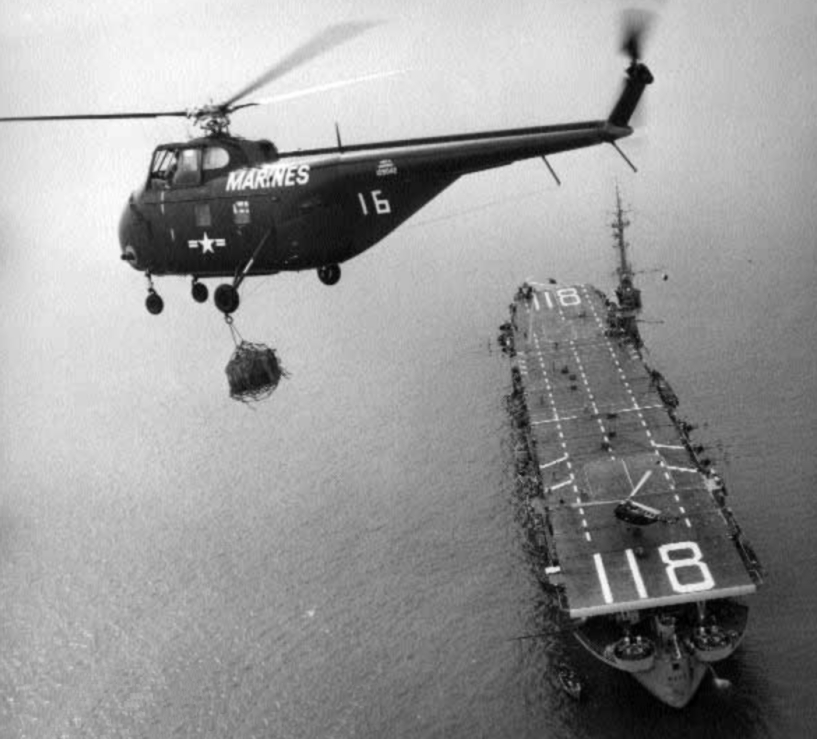
An HMR-163 HRS-2 over USS Sicily (CVE-118), 1952.

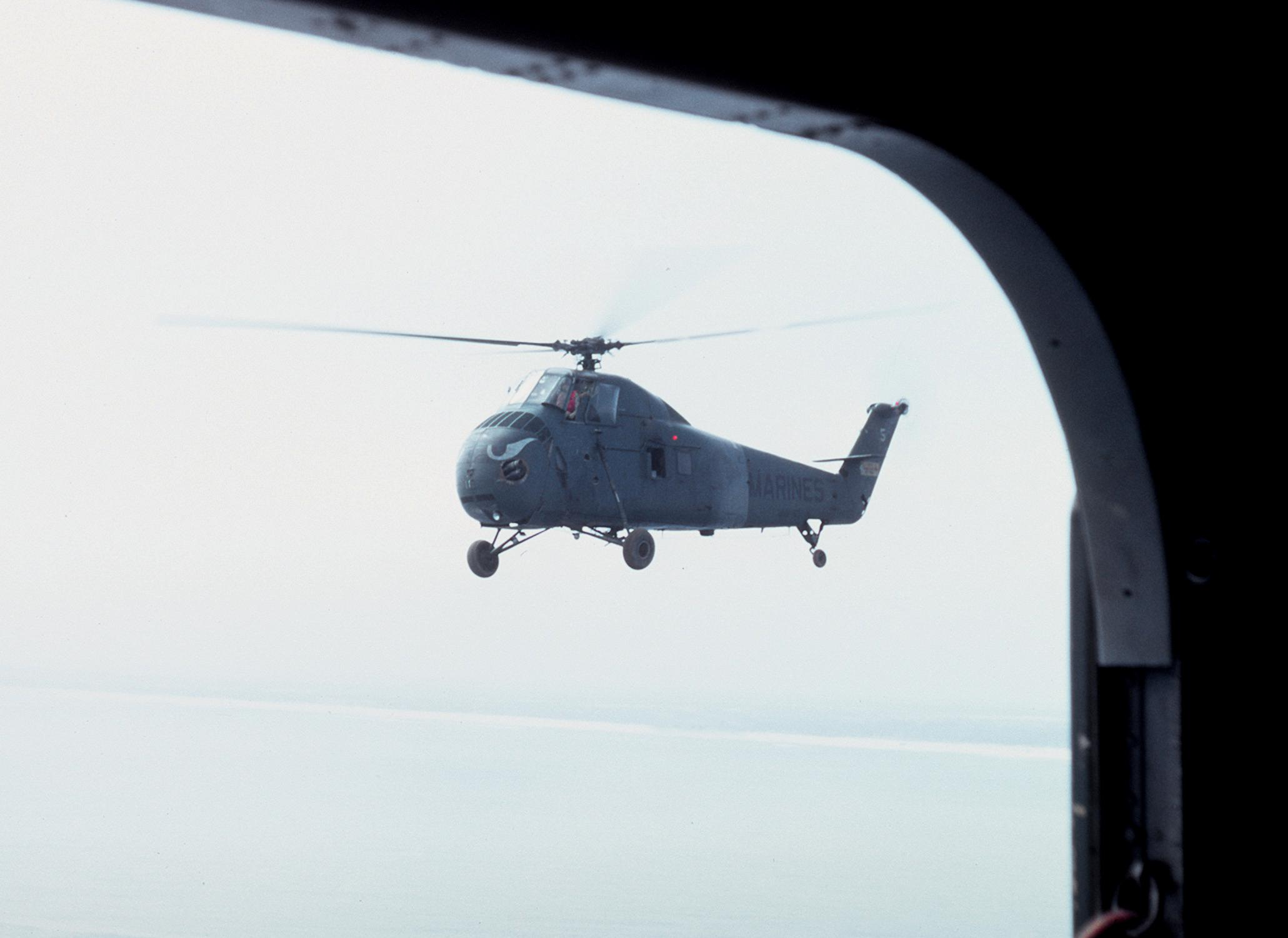
A UH-34D from HMM-163 over Vietnam, 1967.

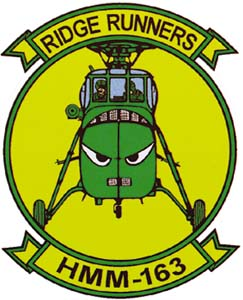
Vietnam-era squadron insignia.

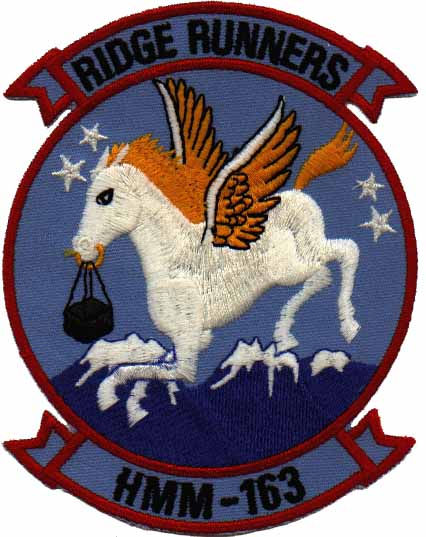
Older squadron insignia

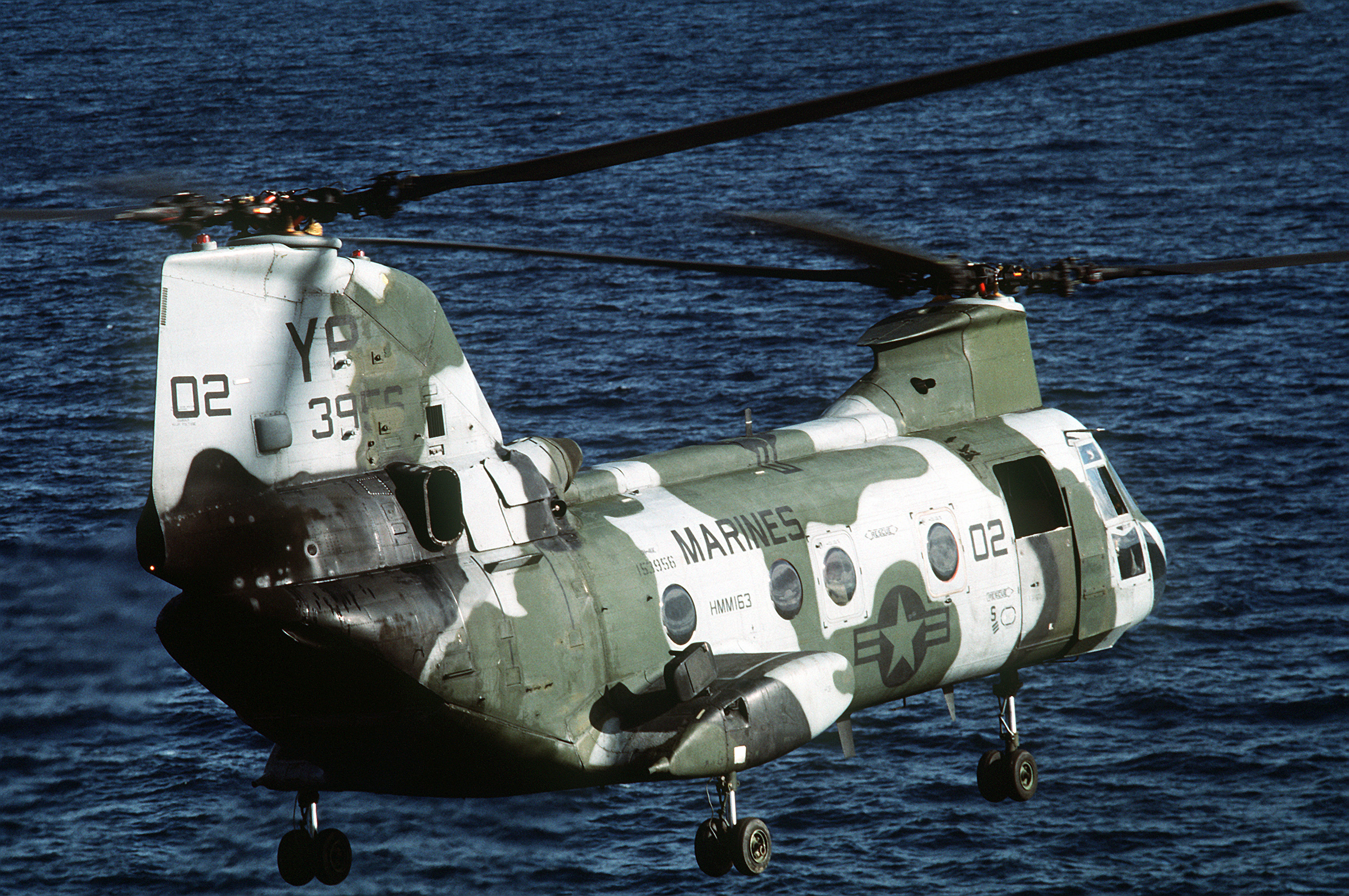
A CH-46E from HMM-163, in 1989.

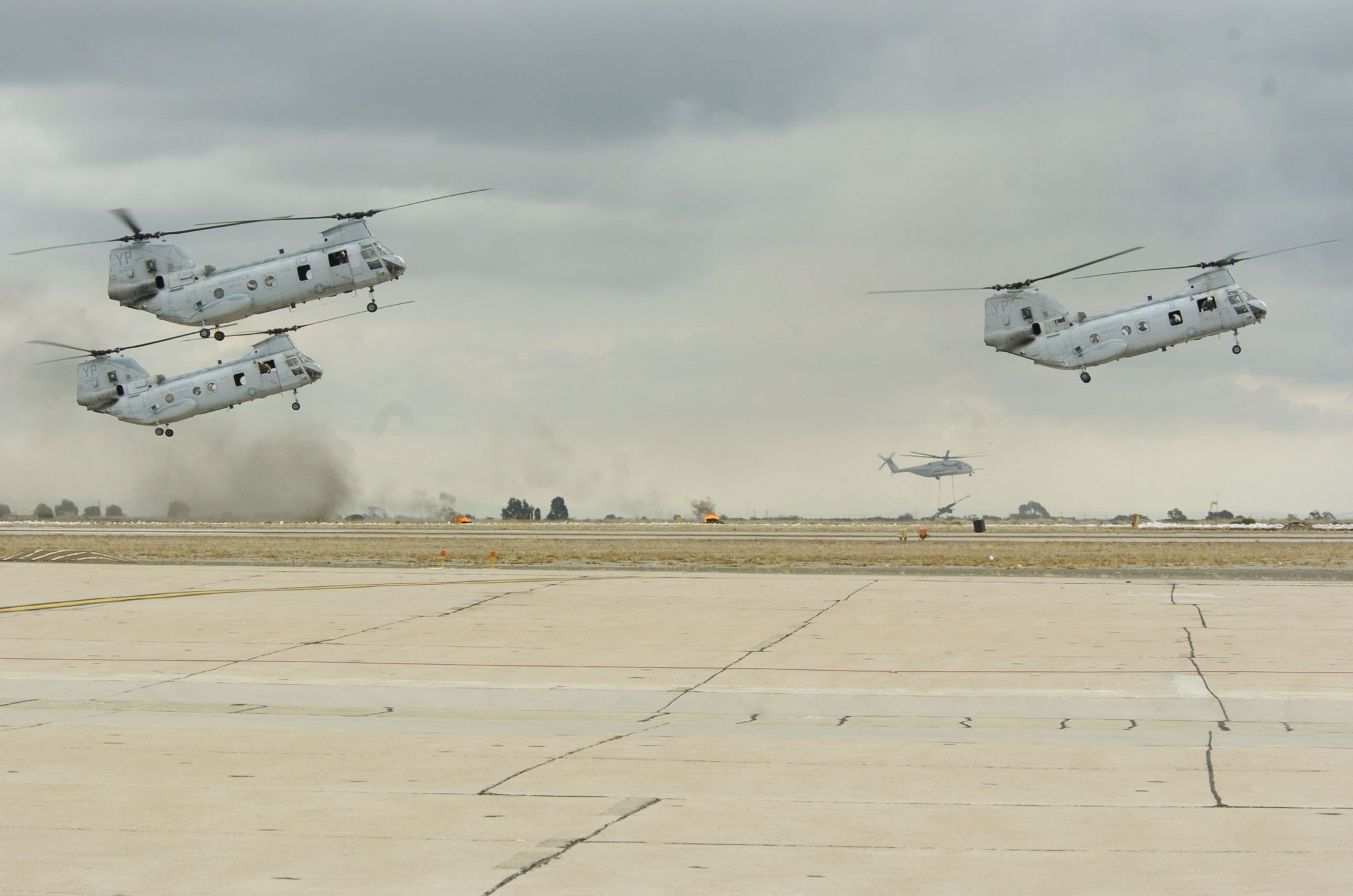
CH-46Es from HMM-163, in 2005.

== See also ==
- List of United States Marine Corps aircraft squadrons
- United States Marine Corps Aviation
