= VMM-261 =

Marine Medium Tiltrotor Squadron 261
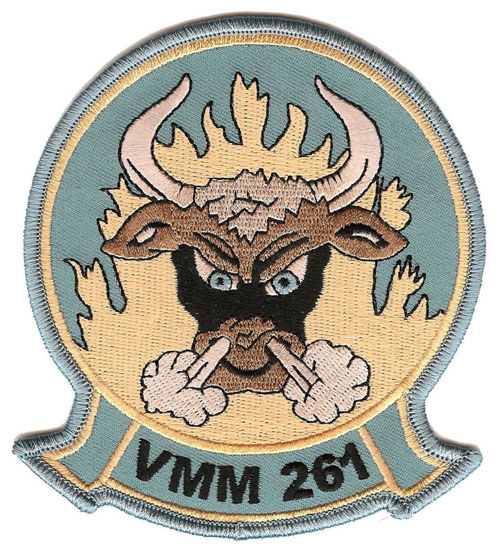
- VMM-261 insignia
- Active: 5 April 1951 – present
- Country: United States
- Branch: USMC
- Type: Medium-lift Tiltrotor Squadron
- Role: Conduct air operations in support of the Fleet Marine Forces
- Part of: Marine Aircraft Group 26; 2nd Marine Aircraft Wing
- Garrison/HQ: Marine Corps Air Station New River
- Nickname: "Raging Bulls"
- Mottos: "First in, Last out"
- Tail Code: EM
- Mascot: Bull
- Engagements: Vietnam War; Operation Urgent Fury; Operation Sharp Edge; Operation Desert Storm; Operation Iraqi Freedom; Operation Enduring Freedom * Operation Cobra's Anger

Commanders
- Current commander: LtCol Joshua L. Foxton

Marine Medium Tiltrotor Squadron 261 (VMM-261) is a United States Marine Corps tiltrotor squadron consisting of MV-22 Osprey transport aircraft. The squadron, known as the "Raging Bulls", is based at Marine Corps Air Station (MCAS) New River, North Carolina and typically falls under the command of Marine Aircraft Group 26 (MAG-26) and the 2nd Marine Aircraft Wing (2nd MAW). They were the fourth squadron in the Marine Corps to transition to the MV-22 Osprey.

== Mission ==
Provide assault support of combat troops, supplies and equipment during amphibious operations and subsequent operations ashore. Routinely, VMM squadrons provide the foundation for an aviation combat element (ACE) of any level Marine Air-Ground Task Force (MAGTF) mission that may include conventional assault support tasks and special operations.

== History ==
=== Early years ===
Marine Helicopter Transport Squadron 261 (HMR-261) was commissioned on 5 April 1951 at Marine Corps Air Station Cherry Point, North Carolina. From 1951 through 1956, HMR-261 carried the tail code of "HM." Since then, it has carried the tail code of "EM" on its helicopters. From 20 January to 28 February 1952 the squadron participated in Operations HELEX I and II to demonstrate ship to shore assault helicopter operations operating from USS Siboney.

In 1954, the squadron moved from MCAS Cherry Point to MCAS New River, North Carolina. In October 1954, HMR-261 embarked its HRS helicopters on the aircraft carrier USS Saipan and sailed for Haiti where they flew humanitarian assistance/disaster relief missions following Hurricane Hazel. In December 1956, the squadron was re-designated Marine Helicopter Transport Squadron (Light) 261 (HMR(L)-261). In February 1957 the squadron began receiving the HUS-1 Seahorse to replace its HRS-1 helicopters. The squadron was the first helicopter squadron to conduct troop lifts on the East coast. In 1961, the squadron was re-designated Marine Medium Helicopter Squadron 261 (HMM-261). The squadron was, by then, flying the UH-34D helicopter. During July and August 1961 the squadron was deployed on USS Thetis Bay in the South China Sea.

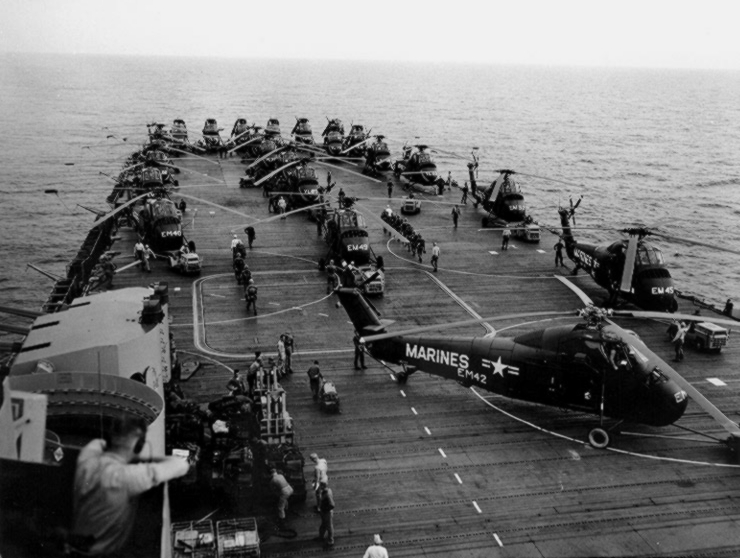
Squadron UH-34s on USS Princeton, March 1960

By April 1962 the squadron was assigned to Marine Aircraft Group 16 (MAG-16) based at Marine Corps Air Station Futenma on Okinawa. The squadron had been participating in an exercise in the Philippines when it received orders to exchange helicopters with HMM-362 operating from USS Princeton. On 15 April HMM-362 went ashore at Sóc Trăng Airfield in the Mekong Delta, South Vietnam to become the first Operation Shufly squadron and the squadron became the Special Landing Force (SLF) helicopter squadron.

On 15 May 1962 in response to the defeat of Royal Lao Army in the Battle of Luang Namtha in early May by People's Army of Vietnam and Pathet Lao forces, it appeared that a communist invasion of northern Thailand was imminent and the Kennedy Administration ordered US combat forces into Thailand to deter any attack. On 18 May the SLF went ashore at Bangkok and then moved to Udorn Royal Thai Air Force Base. On 25 June the squadron was replaced at Udorn by HMM-162.

During October 1962, HMM-261 was embarked aboard USS Boxer and subsequently USS Thetis Bay for support during the Cuban Blockade. Returning to MCAF New River, HMM 261 was deployed to the southern United States during the Civil Rights Movement to support freedom marches in the spring of 1963. Returning to MAG-26, MCAF New River, HMM-261 prepared to stand down for subsequent transfer of its colors to the Western Pacific.

=== Vietnam War ===
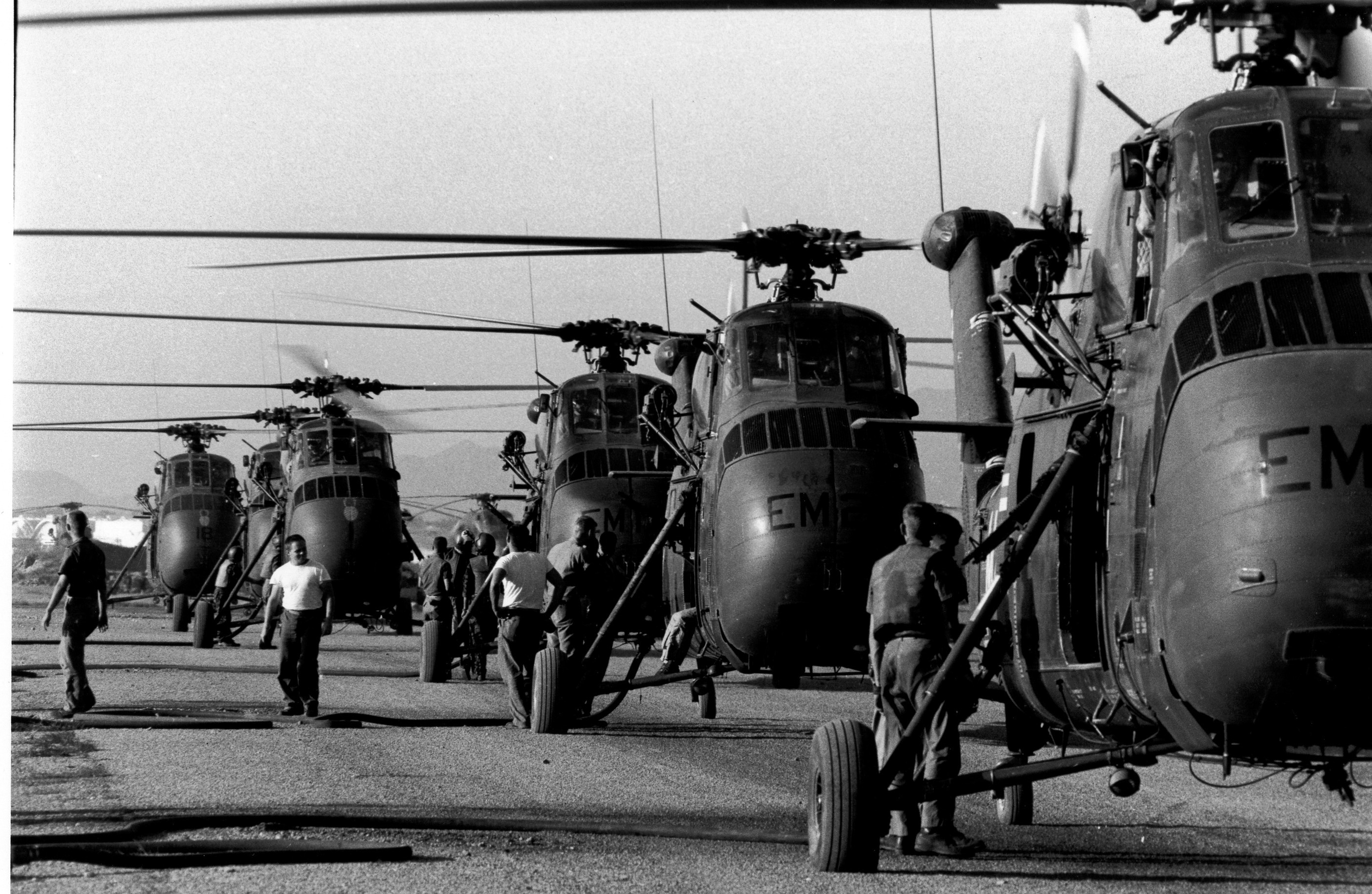
Squadron UH-34s refuel at Da Nang Air Base, July 1965

On 8 June 1963, the squadron began serving as the Operation Shufly squadron at Da Nang Air Base, South Vietnam. In mid-July the squadron suffered its first aircraft loss in a non-fatal accident 37 miles (60 km) southwest of Da Nang. On 16 September another UH-34D was destroyed in a non-fatal crash 25 miles (40 km) west of Huế. On 2 October the squadron was relieved by HMM-361, it had achieved 5,288 combat flying hours and 11,406 sorties.

In 1964, the squadron, deployed aboard USS Iwo Jima as part of the Ready Landing Force in the Western Pacific, participating in training exercises in the Philippine Islands and Taiwan and was afterwards shore-based at MCAS Futenma, Okinawa until returning the squadron colors to MCAF New River. The squadron again departed MCAS New River on May 18, 1965 finally arriving at Kadena Air Base in early June. On June 21, 1965 the squadron was flown to Da Nang Air Base where it replaced HMM-163 and was assigned to Marine Aircraft Group 16 (MAG-16). On August 12, the squadron participated in Operation Midnight the first nighttime helicopter assault.From 18 August the squadron supported Operation Starlite. At the end of August, MAG-16 moved to the newly completed Marble Mountain Air Facility east of Da Nang. On 10 October the squadron was assigned as the SLF helicopter squadron on USS Valley Forge. On 30 November the SLF conducted Operation Dagger Thrust. In December the squadron supported Operation Harvest Moon transporting Marines and Army of the Republic of Vietnam (ARVN) troops.

On 5 January 1966 the squadron came ashore from SLF duty. While In early March the squadron supported Operation Utah. On 26 May the squadron left South Vietnam. During its 1965-66 tour HMM-261 flew 11,859 combat hours, MEDEVAC-ed 2,315 wounded, flew 38,090 combat sorties, ferried 47,522 troops into battle and expended 32,610 rounds of ammunition.

=== 1966-1970s ===
In 1966, the squadron returned to New River again. During the late 1960s, the squadron accepted their first CH-46 Sea Knight helicopters. The squadron later flew an updated model of the same helicopter, the CH-46E. Throughout the 1970s, the squadron participated in various training exercises in the Atlantic, Mediterranean, and Caribbean regions. It was during this time that the squadron added to their nickname and became the "Raging Bulls".

=== 1980s ===
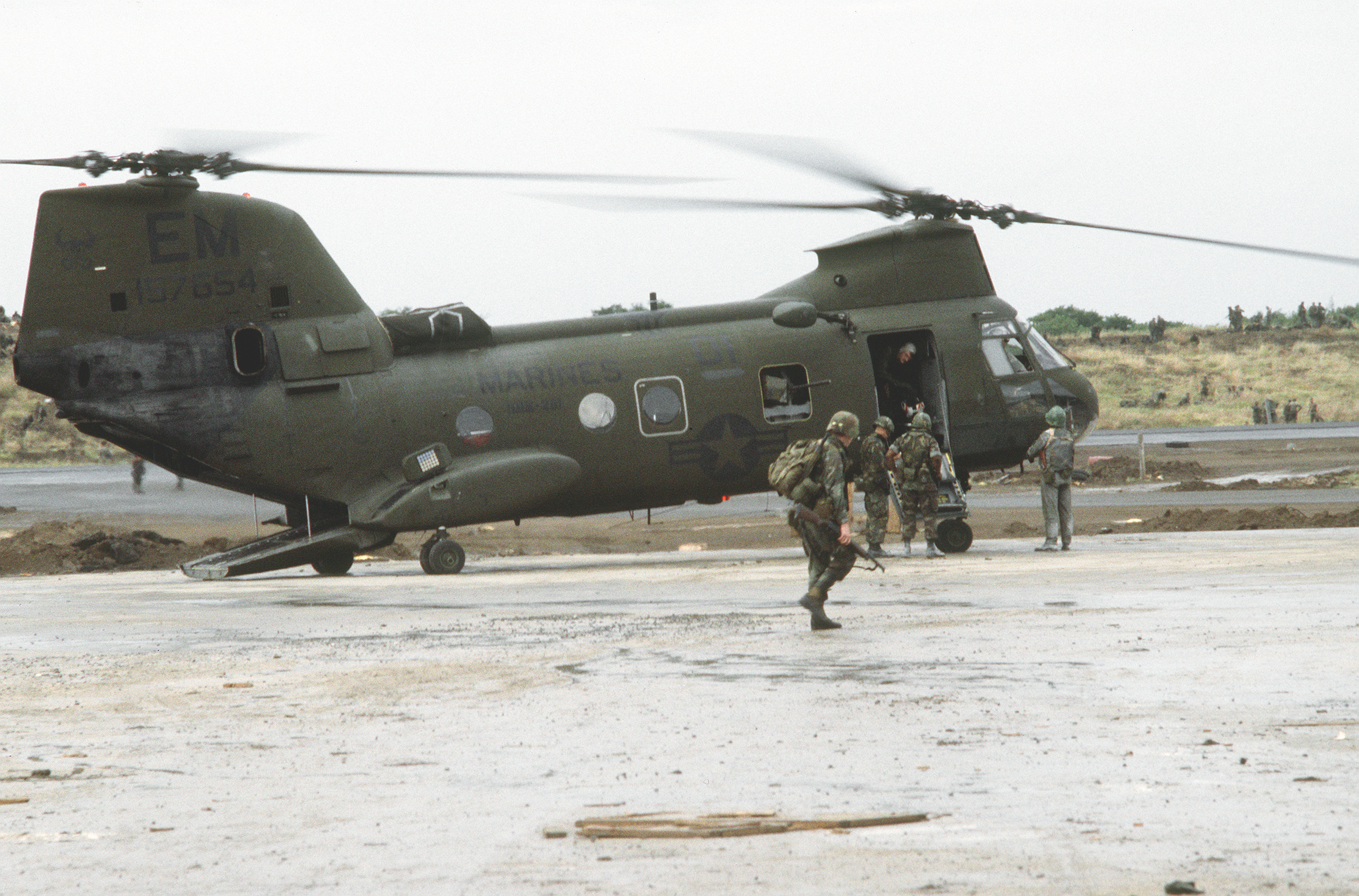
"Elvis 01" a CH-46E of HMM-261 awaits the loading of Army Rangers on Grenada during Operation Urgent Fury, October 1983.

In 1982, the squadron deployed to Beirut, Lebanon. In October 1983, the squadron had just departed Naval Base Norfolk aboard USS Guam heading toward Beirut, but received word to divert to the Caribbean for the invasion of Grenada, codenamed Operation Urgent Fury. There, the squadron provided the only helicopters for the initial landings of Marines and subsequent operations for the entire joint task force until Army helicopters arrived on the third day of action. Delta Force had arrived by Army helicopters as part of the initial assault, but after day one all the Army helicopters were unavailable due combat damage. While providing close air support to Army forces, two AH-1T Cobras were shot down resulting in three squadron pilots being killed. Later one CH-46 was damaged beyond repair during the successful rescue of several hundred American students at the Medical School's Grand Anse Campus, while inserting Rangers of 2nd Battalion, 75th Ranger Regiment. Following this operation, the squadron resumed its mission to continue to Beirut, to relieve 24th Marine Amphibious Unit which had endured the bombing of the Marine barracks. While stationed off Beirut, the squadron conducted a variety of missions in support of the 22nd Marine Amphibious Unit located ashore, U.S. 6th Fleet and the Department of State (flying diplomats to/from the various meetings and evacuating over 800 American and Lebanese citizens to safety.)

=== The Gulf War and the 1990s ===
In 1990, the squadron took part in Operation Sharp Edge, which consisted of the evacuation and protection of American citizens in Liberia. In January 1991, following a quick turnaround in New River, the squadron deployed to Saudi Arabia for Operation Desert Shield and Operation Desert Storm. With the ground war in full swing, the squadron flew numerous medevac and assault support missions in support of 2nd Marine Division. The squadron returned home to New River on 13 May 1991.

On 15 April 1997 the squadron prepared for a pending Noncombatant Evacuation Operation (NEO) in the country of Zaire, leaving behind a detachment of four CH-46s and two UH-1Ns to board USS Ponce. The 22nd MEU Forward, which included HMM-261 (REIN) Det. A entered the Mediterranean Sea to cover the 22nd MEU's commitments. During the deployment, the main body of the 22nd MEU participated in two major operations: Operation Guardian Retrieval, operating out of Brazzaville, Congo; and Operation Noble Obelisk, in Freetown, Sierra Leone, which resulted in the evacuation of more than 2,500 American citizens and foreign nationals. Meanwhile, HMM-261 (REIN)'s Det. A participated in Operation Silver Wake in Tirana, Albania. A year later, in October 1998, the squadron was called upon to help provide hurricane relief in Puerto Rico.

=== Global War on Terror ===
In July 2002, the MEU was called upon to conduct operations in support of Operation Enduring Freedom (OEF). Once off the coast of Pakistan, the MEU continued to plan for interdiction operations in Afghanistan. Concurrently AV-8s flew the MEU’s first reconnaissance flights over the country. Advanced parties were dispatched into Pakistan to conduct liaison with host nation agencies.

2003 brought about pre-deployment planning for Operation Iraqi Freedom II. Upon arriving in the Persian Gulf, the squadron flew into 1st Marine Expeditionary Force’s Area of Operation, where it was attached to the 3rd Marine Aircraft Wing at Al Asad Airbase. While in Iraq, HMM-261 was fully engaged in various operations in support of Operation Iraqi Freedom II. The squadron continued to perform direct support missions in the form of casualty evacuation, command and control (C&C) standby, general support, re-supply, troop movements, VIP lifts and tactical recovery of aircraft and personnel (TRAP)/Quick Reaction Force (QRF) during the day and night. In September 2004, the squadron returned to MCAS New River, where it was attached to Marine Aircraft Group 29. During the deployment, HMM-261 successfully completed over 2,000 Aviation Support Requests (ASRs), transported 8,358 passengers and 815,274 lb of cargo, flew 3,058.2 hours and executed 1,941 sorties, with zero combat casualties or loss of any aircraft.

On 8 November 2005, HMM-261 (REIN) conducted their onload to USS Nassau to begin their current deployment as part of the 22nd MEU. They were based at Al Asad air base in western Iraq and on their third tour in support of Operation Iraqi Freedom. The squadron finished its latest tour in Iraq in late March 2006, accomplishing 1,845 sorties and over 3,000 combat flight hours providing medevacs and close air support.

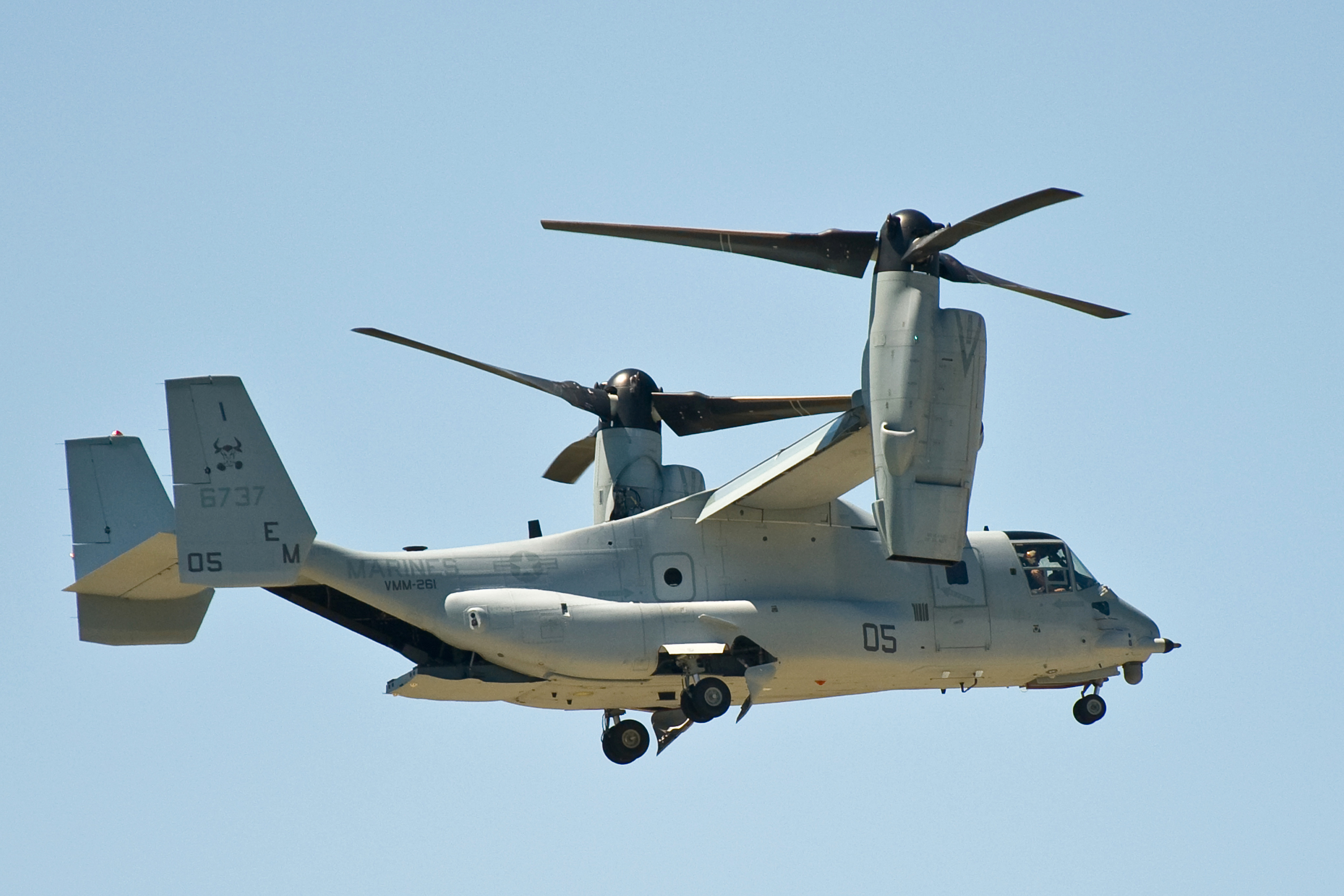
A VMM-261 MV-22B in 2009.

In late 2007, the squadron served as the aviation combat element for the 22nd MEU. From 25 September to 11 October 2007, AV-8Bs attached to the squadron flew 70 combat missions over Afghanistan providing aerial reconnaissance, close air support and convoy escort in support of Operation Enduring Freedom. Following the impact of Cyclone Sidr on 15 November 2007, helicopters from the squadron operating from USS Kearsarge off the coast of Bangladesh in the Bay of Bengal provided humanitarian assistance to those affected by the cyclone.

On 10 April 2008, the squadron transitioned to the MV-22 Osprey after 42 years of flying the CH-46 Sea Knight.

VMM-261 deployed to Afghanistan in November 2009 in support of Operation Enduring Freedom. It marked the first deployment of the MV-22 Osprey to Afghanistan and in early December the squadron supported their first major combat operation when they lifted troops and supplies in support of Operation Cobra's Anger.

In 2014, VMM-261 deployed to Afghanistan as the first Marine Corps casualty evacuation squadron since Operation Iraqi Freedom. Under the call sign “Elvis”, VMM-261 flew combat operations in direct support of Marine Special Operations Command (MARSOC) and International Security Assistance Force (ISAF) within Helmand and Herat provinces. VMM-261 was supplemented with 12 Navy Hospital Corpsmen and 1 Navy Flight Surgeon. The unit was considered enhanced (E-CasEvac) due to the V-22 Osprey’s operational speed and distance superiority over the US Army’s UH-60 Blackhawks (Dustoff) and British CH-47 Chinooks. Due to increased operational range, VMM-261 was assigned medical response responsibility to ISAF casualties beyond 80 nautical miles of a Role 2 Medical Facility.

From October 2023 to June 2024, VMM-261, reinforced with a KC-130J detachment and designated as VMM-261 (REIN), filled the role of the aviation combat element for Combined Joint Task Force — Horn of Africa (CJTF-HOA) on Camp Lemonnier, Djibouti. In December 2023, all V-22s were grounded after an Air Force CV-22 crashed in Japan in November 2023. Despite four months of reduced V-22 flight status, VMM-261 (REIN) logged more than 3,000 flight hours, transported over 2 million pounds worth of cargo, and moved thousands of passengers while in the Horn of Africa.

== Notable accidents ==
On 11 April 2012, a squadron MV-22 crashed near Agadir, Morocco, during a joint training exercise after taking off from USS Iwo Jima. Two Marines were killed and two others were seriously injured, and the aircraft was lost. A Marine Corps investigation later deemed the crash was due to pilot error, not a mechanical or safety problem.

== See also ==
- List of active United States Marine Corps aircraft squadrons
- United States Marine Corps Aviation
