= Operation New York =

Part of the Vietnam War (1966)

- Part of the Vietnam War
| Date | 26 February – 3 March 1966 |
| Location | Thừa Thiên Province, South Vietnam 16°23′06″N 107°47′40″E |
| Result | U.S. claims victory |

Belligerents
| United States | Viet Cong |

Commanders and leaders
| BG Lowell English; LCOL Robert T. Hanifin | |

Units involved
| 2nd Battalion 1st Marines; 3rd Battalion 1st Marines | 810th Battalion |

Casualties and losses
| 17 killed | 120 killed 7 captured |

Operation New York was a US Marine Corps operation that took place northwest and east of Phu Bai Combat Base, lasting from 26 February to 3 March 1966.

== Prelude ==
On 26 February the 3rd Marine Division activated Task Unit Hotel, comprising Companies F and G of the 2nd Battalion 1st Marines and Company K of the 3rd Battalion 1st Marines at Phu Bai to support the Army of the Republic of Vietnam (ARVN) 1st Division which was engaged in 3 simultaneous operations. The Task Unit was assigned to sweep the Pho Lai village complex approximately 7 km northwest of Huế where a 100-strong Viet Cong unit was believed to be operating.

== Operation ==
=== 26 February ===
Companies F and G 2/1 Marines arrived by truck at the operation area in the late afternoon, while HMM-163 landed Company K northeast of the village to take up blocking positions. By 22:15 Companies F and G had swept the area and joined up with Company K without encountering any enemy and set up night positions.

=== 27 February ===
Task Unit Hotel left Pho Lai and returned to Phu Bai by 18:15. Shortly after returning to base, the ARVN informed the Marines that their 1st Battalion, 3rd Regiment was heavily engaged with the Viet Cong 810th Battalion on the Phu Thu Peninsula east of the base. The Unit commander LCOL Hanifin ordered a night helicopter assault into positions north of the peninsula and by 02:00 on 28 February HMM-163 had landed all 3 companies.

=== 28 February ===
Under the cover of artillery fire from the Phu Bai base, the 3 Marine Companies moved line abreast down the peninsula with the ARVN providing flank security. The Viet Cong quickly broke up into small groups and attempted to evade the Marines.

== Aftermath ==
Operation New York concluded on 3 March, the Marines had suffered 17 dead and 37 wounded and claimed that the Vietcong suffered 120 killed and 7 captured.
