= VMM-162 =

Marine Medium Tiltrotor Squadron 162
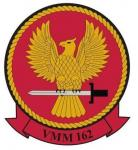
- VMM-162 insignia
- Active: 30 June 1951 - present
- Country: United States
- Allegiance: United States of America
- Branch: United States Marine Corps
- Type: Medium-lift Tiltrotor Squadron
- Role: Assault Support
- Part of: Marine Aircraft Group 26; 2nd Marine Aircraft Wing
- Garrison/HQ: Marine Corps Air Station New River
- Nickname: Golden Eagles
- Tail Code: YS
- Engagements: Vietnam War; Operation Restore Hope; Operation Iraqi Freedom * 2003 invasion of Iraq * Operation Enduring Freedom

Commanders
- Current commander: LtCol Chad S. Kelling
- Notable commanders: Robert F. Hedelund; Karsten S. Heckl

Marine Medium Tiltrotor Squadron 162 (VMM-162) is a United States Marine Corps tiltrotor squadron consisting of MV-22 Osprey transport aircraft. The squadron, known as the "Golden Eagles", is based at Marine Corps Air Station New River, North Carolina and falls under the command of Marine Aircraft Group 26 (MAG-26) and the 2nd Marine Aircraft Wing (2nd MAW). HMM-162 officially stood down 9 December 2005 to begin the process of transitioning to the MV-22 Osprey. On 31 August 2006, the squadron was reactivated as the second operational Osprey squadron in the Marine Corps. VMM-162 was the squadron of the year in 2023.

== History ==
=== Early years ===
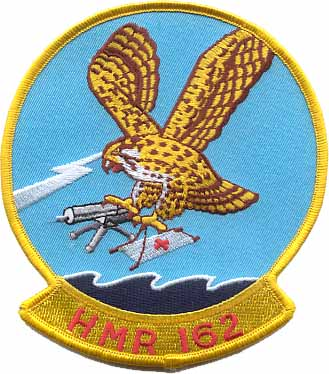
Early HMR-162 insignia

Marine Helicopter Transport Squadron 162 (HMR-162) was commissioned on 30 June 1951, at Marine Corps Air Facility Santa Ana. The primary mission of the squadron at that time was to provide airlift and air supply for the Fleet Marine Force in amphibious operations. The personnel strength of the squadron grew quickly and crews were sent to Marine Corps Air Station Quantico, Virginia to accept and ferry the new Sikorsky HRS-1 helicopters to MCAF Santa Ana.

During these early months, the squadron was occupied primarily with proficiency training, which contributed to the growing body of knowledge of rotary winged aircraft and their tactical employment, ultimately evolving into a basis for the Marine Corps' doctrine of vertical envelopment.

Helicopters of HMR-162 made amphibious warfare history in February 1952 during Operation Lex Baker I, when they airlifted a combat-equipped company of the 3rd Marine Regiment from the escort carrier USS Rendova to the Marine Corps Base Camp Pendleton hills. The ship-to-shore movement was the first ever attempted on such a scale.

On 31 December 1956, the squadron was redesignated as Marine Helicopter Squadron-Light (HMR(L)-162). In the fiscal year 1956, the squadron logged 5,166 accident-free flight hours and was awarded the Chief of Naval Operations Aviation Safety Award.

During March 1957, six Marines of the squadron were awarded the Philippine Legion of Honor for their gallant conduct in the recovery operations at the scene of the death of President Ramon Magsaysay on Cebu Island. The plane carrying the Philippine President from Cebu City to Manila crashed and the squadron was asked to assist in the rescue and recovery operations that were subsequently undertaken.

As the year came to a close HMR(L)-162 boarded the USS Princeton and set sail for the South China Sea. While en route, the ship was ordered to Singapore to load supplies to be helo distributed to flood victims in Ceylon. The squadron used 20 HRS-3s in the operation and logged a total of 1123.9 hours for the five days of evacuation and resupply. One of the recommendations to emerge from this action was that efforts be continued and intensified to devise navigational systems for helicopters.

On 5 February 1959, the squadron was transferred to the Marine Corps Air Station New River, North Carolina, where it reformed as a unit of Marine Aircraft Group 26. During the summer months of 1962, HMR(L)-162 was involved with the relief operations in the Gulf Coast area in the aftermath of Hurricane Carla.

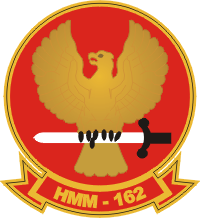
Old HMM-162 insignia

On 2 April 1960, HMR (L)-162 was reduced to zero strength and shifted to the 1st Marine Aircraft Wing. The squadron was immediately built up in a few days at MCAS Futenma, Okinawa as personnel began reporting from MCAS New River.

In late June 1962 the squadron replaced HMM-261 as the helicopter unit supporting the 3rd Marine Expeditionary Unit (3rd MEU) at Udorn Royal Thai Air Force Base, Thailand. Just four days after their arrival the 3rd MEU was ordered to withdraw and the squadron was loaded on the USS Valley Forge and they departed Thailand.

=== Vietnam War ===
On 11 January 1963 the squadron replaced HMM-163 as the Operation Shufly squadron at Da Nang Air Base, South Vietnam. On 10 March two squadron UH-34Ds were engaged in a search and rescue operation for a United States Army OV-1 Mohawk missing in 5,000 feet (1,500 m) mountains 30 miles (48 km) southwest of Quảng Ngãi. As one helicopter lowered a South Vietnamese Ranger on a rescue hoist the helicopter lost power and crashed, killing the Ranger and the copilot. Another UH-34D crashed nearby while attempting to rescue the crew, its crew was recovered and the helicopter destroyed. On 13 April the squadron landed Army of the Republic of Vietnam (ARVN) troops from the 2nd Division 30 miles (48 km) south of Danang escorted for the first time by U.S. Army UH-1B gunships from the 68th Aviation Company. In spite of the additional support three UH-34s were shot down during the operation. All three aircraft were eventually recovered.On 27 April the squadron supported Operation Bach Phuong XI, an ARVN attack on the Vietcong (VC) stronghold at Đỗ Xá (15.177°N 108.078°E), one helicopter was hit in the initial landings and had to be destroyed. From late April the squadron supported a 90-day operation by the ARVN 1st Division along the Laos border. On 8 June the squadron was replaced by HMM-261, during its deployment it had flown 17,670 sorties for a total of 8,579 flight hours, losing one Marine killed and three UH-34Ds destroyed.

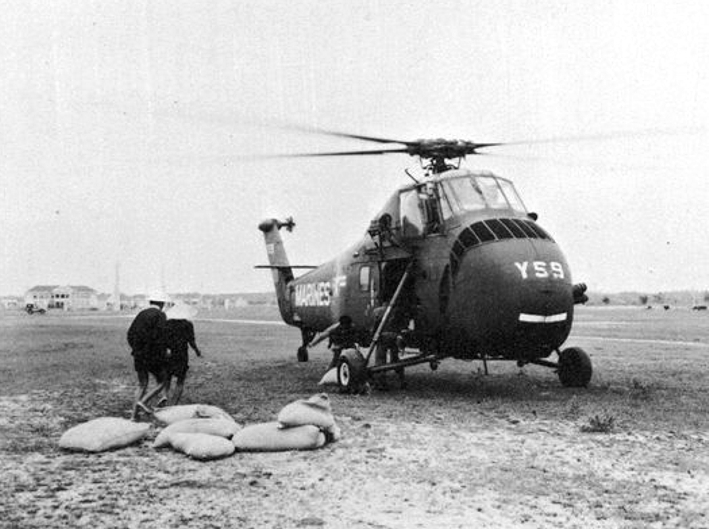
HMM-162 UH-34D assists with flood recovery efforts, November 1964

In mid-June 1964 the squadron came ashore from USS Valley Forge to replace HMM-364 as the Shufly squadron at Da Nang Air Base, with the formal handover on 19 June. The squadron supported the U.S. and South Vietnamese forces engaged in the Battle of Nam Dong from 5–6 July. On 18 July the squadron evacuated the Marine team on Tiger Tooth Mountain (Dong Voi Mẹp) (16.768°N 106.713°E) to Khe Sanh. At the same time a four helicopter detachment was sent to Udorn to assist with search and rescue operations. On 30 August a squadron UH-34D hit trees on a small high elevation landing zone and crash-landed the crew was rescued and the helicopter stripped and destroyed. On 4 September the squadron supported Operation Chinh Bien an ARVN 2nd Division assault in Quảng Nam Province. On 21 September the squadron flew to Nha Trang to escape Typhoon Tilda, returning on 23 September. On 8 October the squadron was relieved in place by the men of HMM-365, during this deployment the squadron had conducted approximately 6,600 sorties for a total of slightly over 4,400 flight hours, losing two UH-34Ds. On 17 November, the squadron which now formed the helicopter unit of the Special Landing Force (SLF) on USS Princeton joined recovery efforts in the aftermath of Typhoon Kate. During six days the squadron flew over 600 hours and completed 1,020 sorties. On 21 November one of its helicopters crashed at sea with two Marines killed.

On 4 March 1965 the squadron returned to Okinawa from SLF duty. On 9 March the squadron's personnel were flown into Da Nang Air Base where they took over the helicopters of HMM-365. The squadron became operational on 12 March and was assigned to support the newly landed 9th Marine Expeditionary Brigade (9th MEB). On 6 May the squadron was reassigned to the 1st Marine Aircraft Wing and on 15 May the squadron was relieved by HMM-365, it returned to Okinawa and then the United States.

=== 1980s ===
In 1983, the squadron deployed as part of the 24th Marine Amphibious Unit aboard the USS Iwo Jima to Beirut, Lebanon. While in theater, the squadron provided helicopter support during the deployment, and provided critical support during the aftermath of the 1983 Beirut barracks bombing.

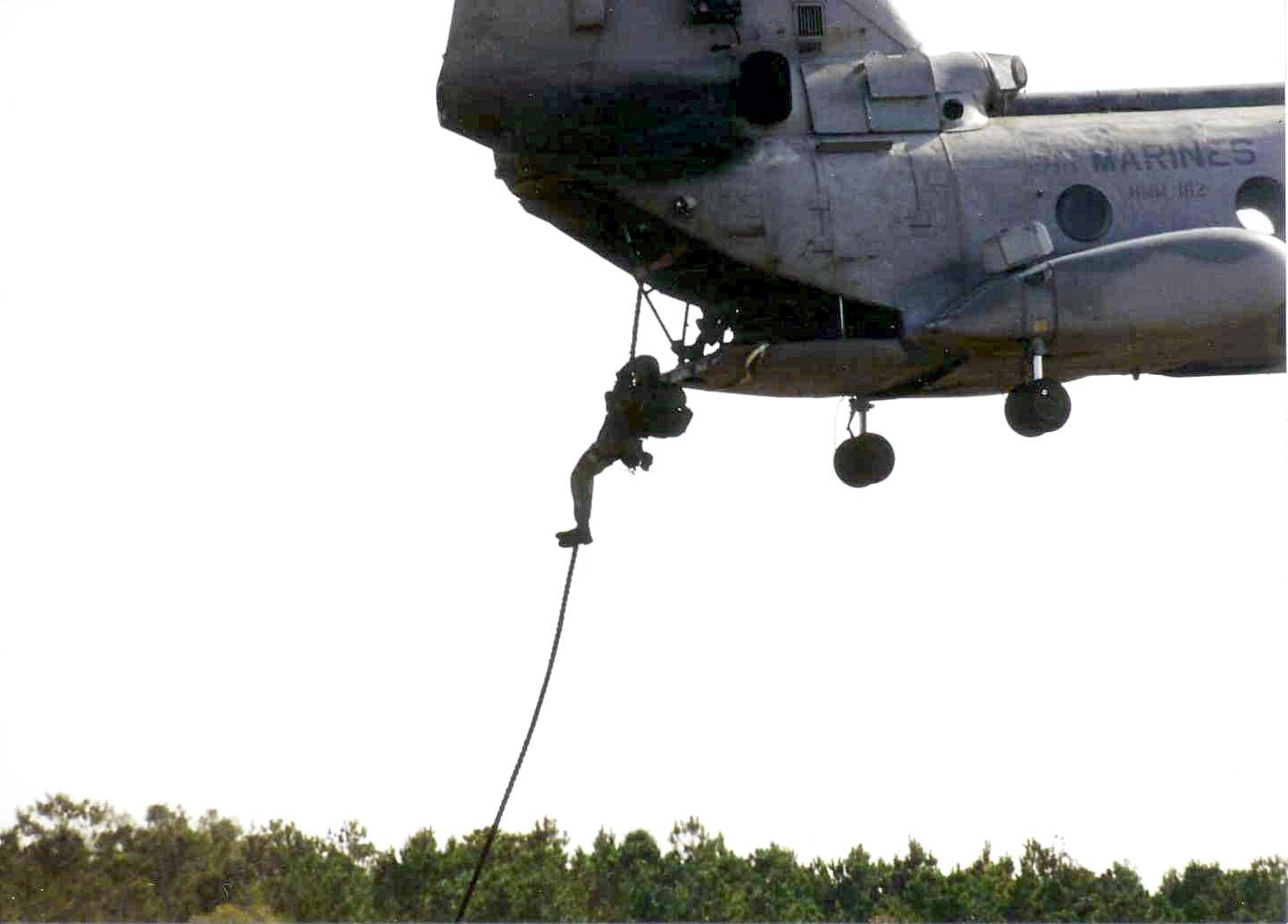
Marines fastrope from a HMM-162 helicopter

=== Gulf War and the 1990s ===
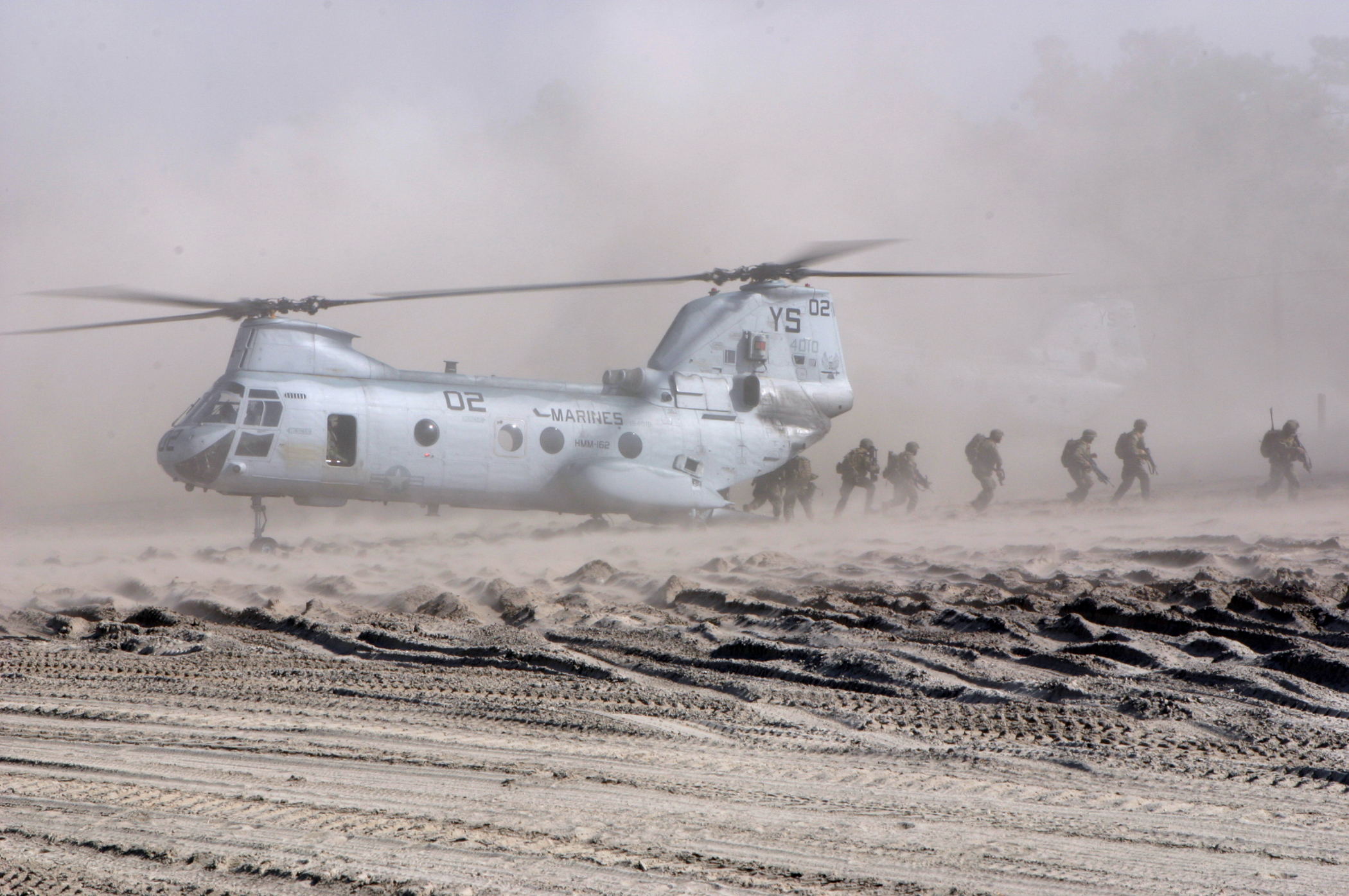
HMM-162 Phrog practices a raid at Camp Lejeune in 2004

While filling the role as the strategic reserve for Operation Desert Storm, HMM-162 participated in the noncombatant evacuation operation (NEO), Operation Sharp Edge in war-torn Liberia. During this operation the "Golden Eagles" evacuated 226 American citizens and 2,400 third-country nationals.

The squadron also participated in Operation Provide Comfort in northern Iraq and in Operation Restore Hope in Somalia and Operation Deny Flight in Bosnia in 1993 while as part of the 22nd Marine Expeditionary Unit (22nd MEU).

=== Global war on terror ===
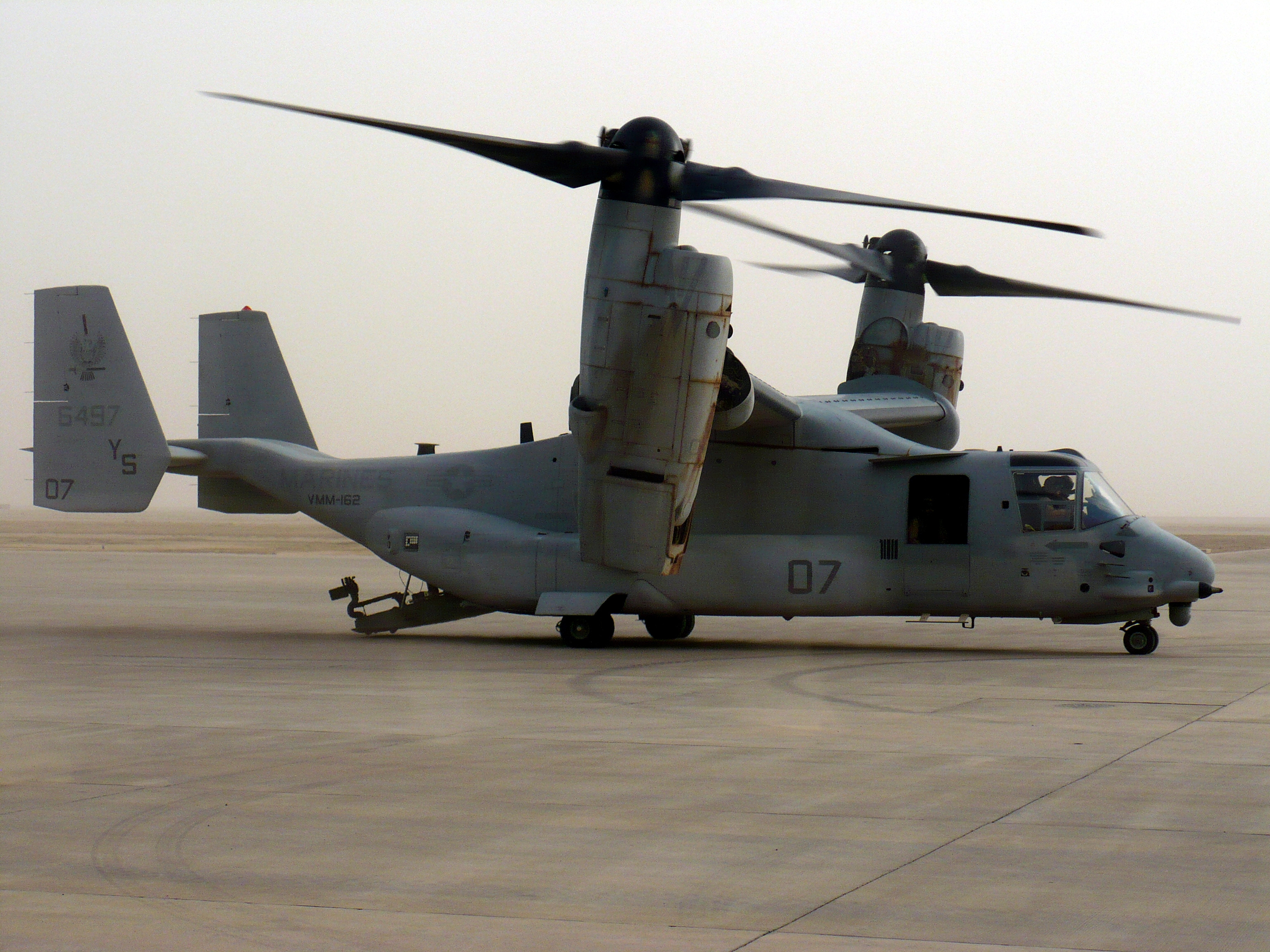
VMM-162 Osprey on the tarmac in Iraq on 1 April 2008.

In 2003, HMM-162 initially deployed on amphibious shipping to the Persian Gulf to support the 2003 invasion of Iraq. The squadron operated afloat, flying long range combat missions with other Marine Aircraft Group 29 squadrons. When ramp space became available at Jalibah Airfield the squadron moved ashore. During the two-month period that it flew in support of the I Marine Expeditionary Force in Iraq, HMM-162 transported more than 500,000 pounds of cargo, 2,200 passengers and flew more than 900 flight hours.

HMM-162 officially stood down 9 December 2005 to begin the process of transitioning to the MV-22 Osprey. On 31 August 2006, the squadron was reactivated as the second operational Osprey squadron in the Marine Corps.

In early April 2008, VMM-162 quietly deployed to Iraq to take over from VMM-263, the first operational V-22 combat unit. While in Iraq, VMM-162 transported several high-profile people around the country including then-presidential candidate Barack Obama.

=== 2010 Haiti earthquake ===
After the devastating 2010 Haiti earthquake on 12 January, VMM-162, serving as the aviation combat element of the 24th Marine Expeditionary Unit (24th MEU) was diverted from its scheduled Middle East deployment to provide humanitarian assistance and disaster relief to Haiti, as part of Operation Unified Response. The squadron's Ospreys, operating from the USS Nassau (LHA-4) were the first ever used for a humanitarian mission.

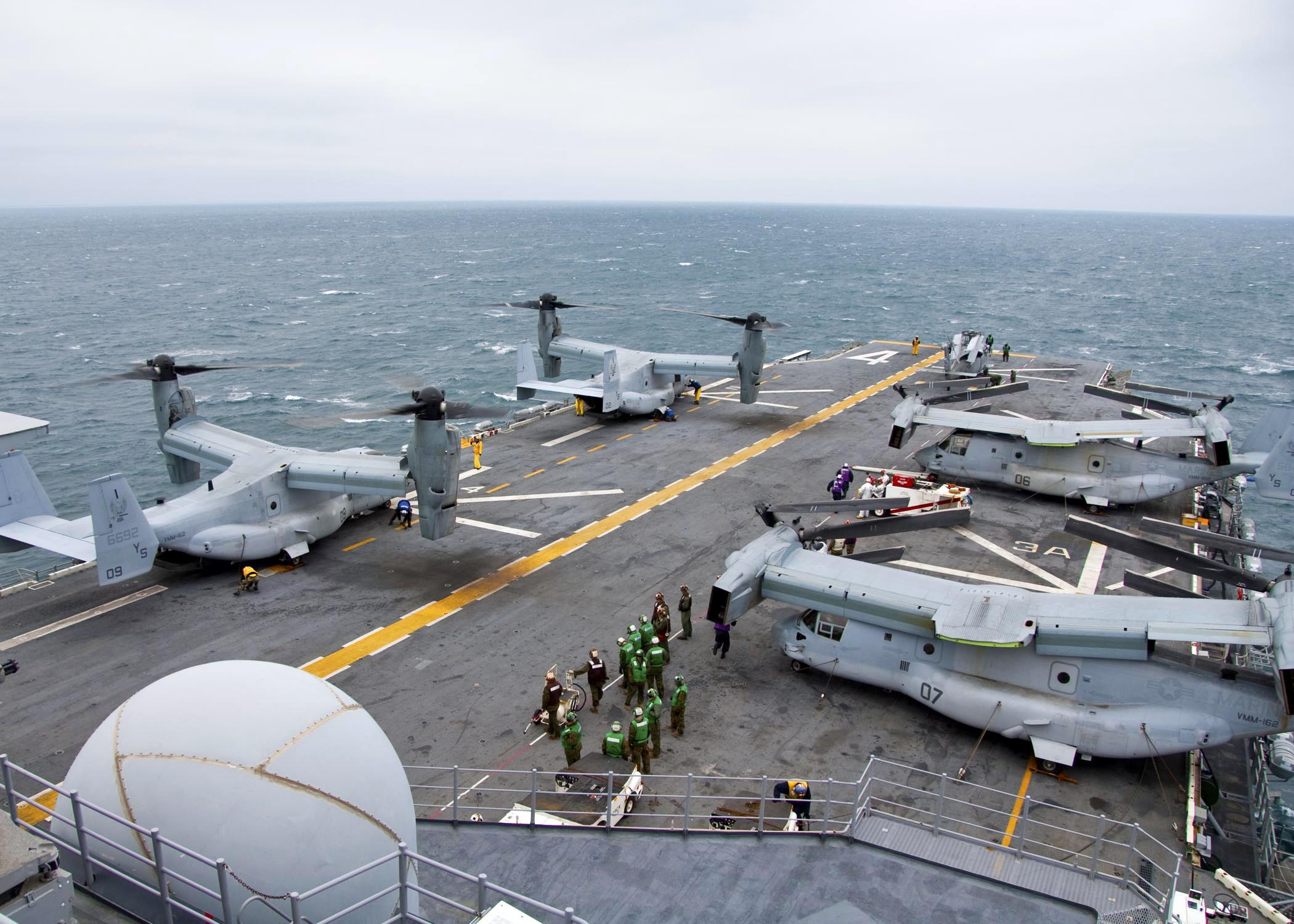
VMM-162 aboard USS Nassau in the Atlantic, December 2009

== Unit awards ==
A unit citation or commendation is an award bestowed upon an organization for the action cited. Members of the unit who participated in said actions are allowed to wear on their uniforms the awarded unit citation. As of 28 April 2015, VMM-162 has been presented with the following awards:

Streamer	Award	Year(s)	Additional Info
A streamer with red, gold, and blue horizontal stripes with a bronze star in the center	Presidential Unit Citation Streamer with two Bronze Stars	1965, 2003	Vietnam (1965), Iraq (2003)
A green streamer with red, gold, and blue horizontal stripes along the top and bottom with one silver star in the center	Navy Unit Commendation Streamer with one Bronze Star		Vietnam (1963-64), Lebanon (1983)
	Meritorious Unit Commendation Streamer with three Bronze Stars	1974, 1979, 1986–87, 1998	
	National Defense Service Streamer with three Bronze Stars	1951–1954, 1961–1974, 1990–1995, 2001–present	Korean War, Vietnam War, Gulf War, war on terrorism
	Korean Service Streamer		
	Marine Corps Expeditionary Streamer with three Bronze Stars		
	Armed Forces Expeditionary Streamer	1992–1993	Somalia
	Vietnam Service Streamer with two Bronze Stars		
	Southwest Asia Service Streamer with one Bronze Star		
	Afghanistan Campaign Streamer with one bronze star		
	Iraq Campaign Streamer with two Bronze Stars		
	Global War on Terrorism Expeditionary Streamer		March–May 2003
	Global War on Terrorism Service Streamer	2001–present	
	Vietnam Cross of Gallantry with Palm Streamer		

== See also ==
- List of United States Marine Corps aircraft squadrons
- United States Marine Corps Aviation
