= Operation Shufly =

Part of the Vietnam War (1962–1965)

- Part of Vietnam War
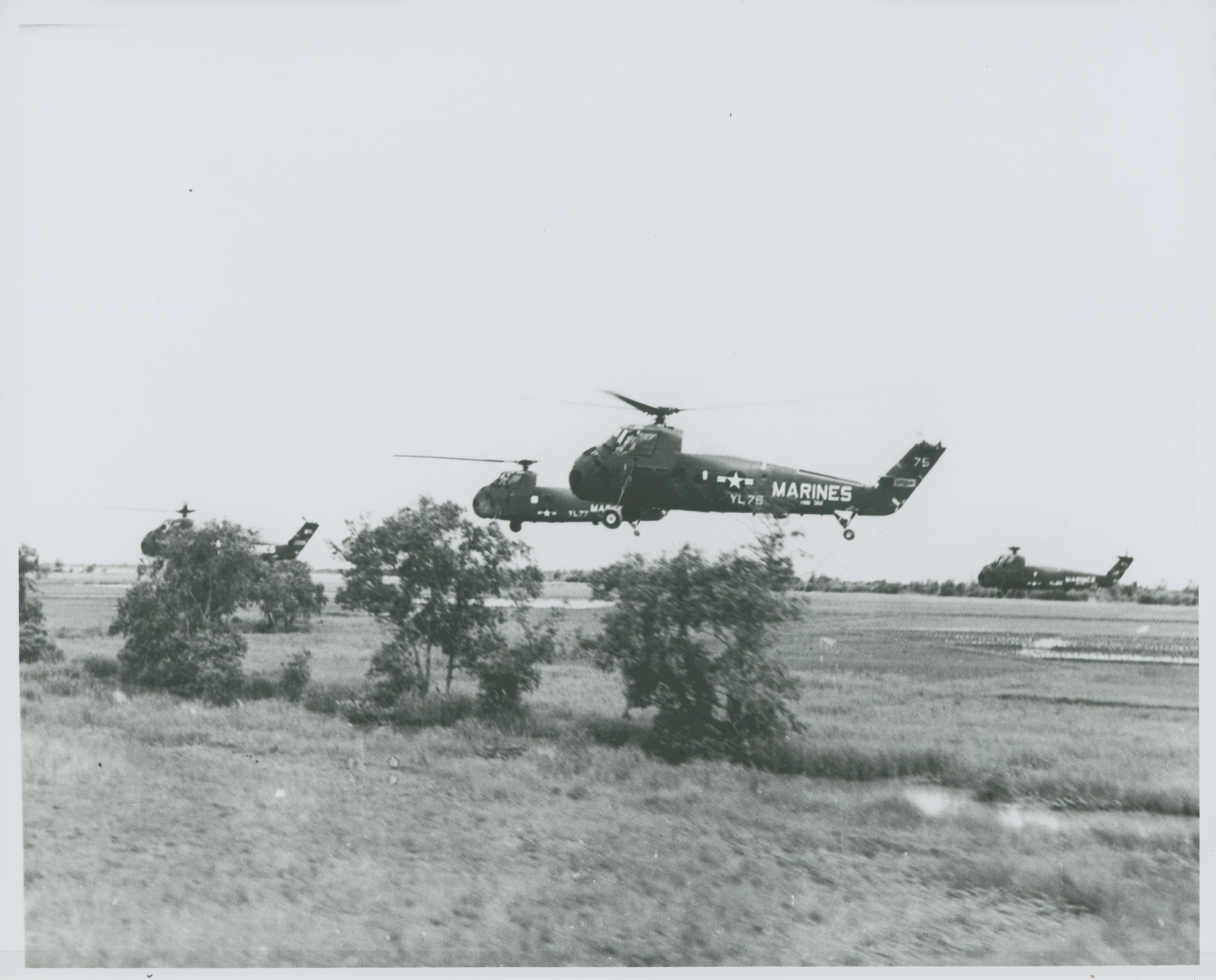
- HMM-362 H-34s in 1962
Date	15 April 1962 to 8 March 1965
Location	South Vietnam

Belligerents
United States	Viet Cong

Units involved
HMM-362; HMM-163; HMM-162; HMM-261; HMM-361; HMM-365	

Casualties and losses
19 killed 14 H-34s destroyed	

Operation Shufly was a United States Marine Corps operation to improve the mobility of Army of the Republic of Vietnam (ARVN) forces in the early phases of the Vietnam War from 1962 to 1965. Beginning on 15 April 1962, Marine helicopter squadrons, associated maintenance units and air traffic control detachments deployed to Sóc Trăng Airfield in the Mekong Delta and later to Da Nang Air Base rotating every four months in order to provide assault support and CASEVAC assistance during combat operations. By early 1965 half of the Marine Corps' medium helicopter squadrons had rotated through a "Shufly" deployment. The operation ended on 8 March 1965, when the 9th Marine Expeditionary Brigade came ashore in Vietnam as the vanguard of the United States' commitment of large numbers of regular combat units into South Vietnam.

== Background ==
After General Maxwell D. Taylor's report to President John F. Kennedy at the end of 1961, the Joint Chiefs of Staff sent word to then Commander in Chief, Pacific Admiral Harry D. Felt to prepare for increased combat operations in South Vietnam. There was an immediate need for addition helicopter squadrons to augment United States Army units that were already there. On 6 March 1962, the Joint Chiefs approved Admiral Felt's recommendation for an additional Army squadron. After much back and forth between senior US leadership it was determined that the Marines would deploy a medium helicopter squadron from Marine Aircraft Group 16 (MAG-16) based at Marine Corps Air Station Futema in Okinawa, Japan to fulfill the need. The deployment order for the Marines was approved on 16 March 1962.

Marine planners from the 1st Marine Aircraft Wing (1st MAW) built Task Unit 79.3.5 (codenamed "Shufly") around a Marine medium helicopter squadron. The Marine squadron would be based at an old Japanese airstrip near Sóc Trăng in the Mekong Delta some 85 miles (137 km) southwest of Saigon. Shufly was under the Operational control of ComUSMACV, but remained under administrative control of 1st MAW. This allowed the Marine Corps and Navy to provide the majority of logistical support for the unit.

== Operations ==
Marine Medium Helicopter Squadron 362 (HMM-362) served as the first Marine aircraft unit in South Vietnam. The squadron went ashore with their Sikorsky UH-34s on 15 April 1962 from the USS Princeton landing at Sóc Trăng Airfield in the Mekong Delta. The squadron was reinforced by three Cessna OE-1 observation aircraft from VMO-2 and one R4D for liaison and supply flights. This mission codenamed Operation Shufly was to increase the mobility of Army of the Republic of Vietnam (ARVN) units fighting the Vietcong (VC) in the rice producing Delta region. The squadron was commanded by Lieutenant Colonel Archie Clapp and it gained the nickname "Archie’s Angels". The nickname evolved to "Ugly Angels" that gave HMM-362 their call sign. The squadron conducted their first operation on 22 April lifting soldiers from the ARVN 7th Division. On 24 April the squadron supported the ARVN 21st Division in Operation Nightingale near Cần Thơ, during this operation VC fire hit a UH-34 severing a hydraulic line forcing it to make an emergency landing, but the helicopter was repaired and flown out. In June the squadron developed the concept of the Eagle Flight where four Marine helicopters loaded with about 50 ARVN soldiers circled above an operational area on alert for any VC attempting to evade the ground forces. Once the VC were located, often by the OE-1 observation aircraft, the helicopters would land the ARVN soldiers at a position where they could block the VC escape.

In late July 1962, HMM-163 deployed to Sóc Trăng and on 1 August it replaced HMM-362 as the Shufly squadron. In early September 1962, HMM-163 began redeploying with its support units from MAG-16 to Da Nang Air Base, completing the redeployment by 20 September. On 6 October the squadron suffered its first fatalities when a search and rescue UH-34 crashed due to mechanical failure 15 miles (24 km) southwest of Tam Kỳ killing five Marines and two Navy corpsmen with only the pilot surviving. During their time in South Vietnam the squadron's crews had flown a total of 10,869 hours, 15,200 sorties and had lifted over 25,216 combat assault troops and 59,024 other passengers.

On 11 January 1963 HMM-162 replaced HMM-163 as the Shufly squadron. On 10 March two squadron UH-34Ds were engaged in a search and rescue operation for a United States Army OV-1 Mohawk missing in 5,000 feet (1,500 m) mountains 30 miles (48 km) southwest of Quảng Ngãi. As one helicopter lowered a South Vietnamese Ranger on a rescue hoist the helicopter lost power and crashed, killing the Ranger and the copilot. Another UH-34D crashed nearby while attempting to rescue the crew, its crew was recovered and the helicopter destroyed. On 13 April the squadron landed ARVN troops from the 2nd Division 30 miles (48 km) south of Danang escorted for the first time by U.S. Army UH-1B gunships from the 68th Aviation Company. In spite of the additional support three UH-34s were shot down during the operation. All three aircraft were eventually recovered. On 27 April the squadron supported Operation Bach Phuong XI, an ARVN attack on the VC stronghold at Đỗ Xá (15.177°N 108.078°E), one helicopter was hit in the initial landings and had to be destroyed. From late April the squadron supported a 90-day operation by the ARVN 1st Division along the Laos border. On 8 June the squadron was replaced by HMM-261, During its deployment it had flown 17,670 sorties for a total of 8,579 flight hours, losing one Marine killed and three UH-34Ds destroyed.

On 8 June 1963, HMM-261 began serving as the Shufly squadron. In mid-July the squadron suffered its first aircraft loss in a non-fatal accident 37 miles (60 km) southwest of Da Nang. On 16 September another UH-34D was destroyed in a non-fatal crash 25 miles (40 km) west of Huế. The squadron achieved 5,288 combat flying hours and 11,406 sorties during its deployment.

On 2 October 1963 HMM-361 become the latest Shufly helicopter squadron. On 8 October two squadron UH—34Ds crashed almost simultaneously while on a search and rescue mission 38 miles (61 km) southwest of Da Nang. Both helicopters burned, killing 10 men; the pilots, copilots, the squadron's flight surgeon, and five crewmen. It was unclear if the helicopters had been shot down or collided in mid-air. On 3 January 1964 another squadron UH-34 was shot down by the VC 30 miles (48 km) west of Da Nang with no casualties. The squadron completed its Shufly assignment on 1 February having flown 4,236 combat flight hours and just under 7,000 combat sorties.

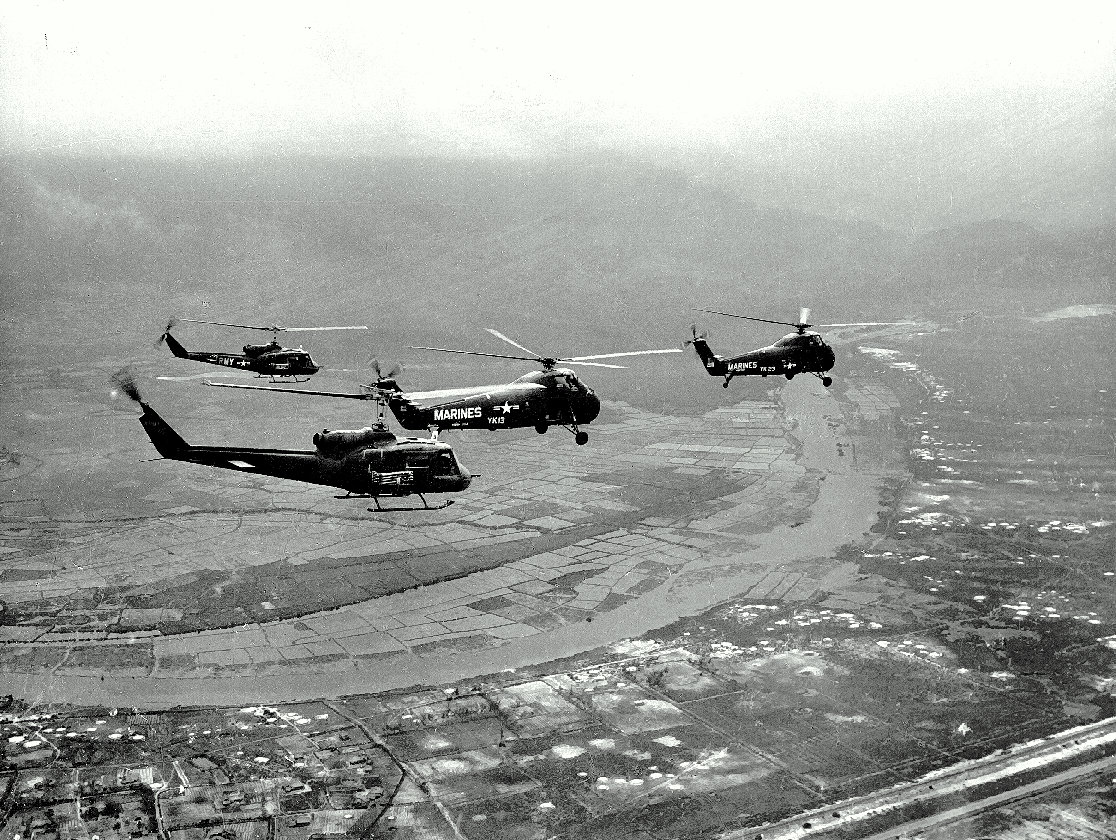
U.S. Army UH-1B gunships escort HMM-364 UH-34Ds in 1964

On 1 February 1964 HMM-364 relieved HMM-361 as the Shufly squadron. On its arrival the squadron began training Republic of Vietnam Air Force (RVNAF) crews to operate the UH-34 in preparation for forming their own squadrons. On 14 April a squadron UH-34D was shot down on a medevac mission 40 miles (64 km) west of Danang near the Laos border, the crew was rescued and the helicopter was destroyed. On 18 April the squadron supported Operation Lam Son 115 an ARVN attack in the A Sầu Valley. From 27 April to 25 May the squadron supported Operation Quyet Thang 202 another ARVN attack on the VC stronghold at Đỗ Xá. On 28 April a squadron UH-34 got caught in the rotor wash of another helicopter and crashed into a canal at Quảng Ngãi, the crew escaped but the helicopter was a total loss. On 30 April a squadron UH-34 was shot down while evacuating an ARVN patrol 42 miles (68 km) west of Danang with no losses. On 13 June a squadron UH-34 on a resupply mission from Khe Sanh to Tiger Tooth Mountain (Dong Voi Mẹp) (16.768°N 106.713°E) was caught in downdrafts and crashed, all crewmen were rescued but the helicopter was destroyed. On 16 June the squadron ceased operations and began preparing its UH-34Ds for handover to the RVNAF with the handover taking place on 19 June and the helicopters were used to form the 217th Helicopter Squadron. By the end of June the squadron had been flown back to Okinawa and their role had been assumed by HMM-162.

In mid-June 1964 HMM-162 came ashore from USS Valley Forge to replace HMM-364 as the Shufly squadron, with the formal handover on 19 June. The squadron supported the U.S. and South Vietnamese forces engaged in the Battle of Nam Dong from 5–6 July. On 18 July the squadron evacuated the Marine team on Tiger Tooth Mountain (Dong Voi Mẹp) to Khe Sanh. On 30 August a squadron UH-34D hit trees on a small high elevation landing zone and crash-landed the crew was rescued and the helicopter stripped and destroyed. On 4 September the squadron supported Operation Chinh Bien an ARVN 2nd Division assault in Quảng Nam Province. On 21 September the squadron flew to Nha Trang to escape Typhoon Tilda, returning on 23 September. During this deployment the squadron had conducted approximately 6,600 sorties for a total of slightly over 4,400 flight hours, losing two UH-34Ds.

On 8 October 1964 HMM-365 relieved HMM-162 as the Shufly squadron. On 11 October the newly arrived Marine pilots and aircrews were involved in their first firefight when eight UH-34Ds drew VC fire while landing a 112-man Vietnamese unit in the hills 10 miles (20 km) west-southwest of Tam Ky. On October 26, the squadron suffered their first combat casualties when a copilot and crew chief were wounded by VC small arms fire while their helicopter was approaching an enemy contested landing zone 10 miles (20 km) southwest of Tam Ky. The pilot was able to return the damaged aircraft to Tam Ky and land safely. In early November, at the height of the monsoon season, Typhoon Iris struck the Vietnamese Coast. The hazardous weather conditions caused flight operations to be suspended except for emergency medical evacuations. When flight operations resumed on 10 November the crews concentrated on rescuing Vietnamese civilians from the inundated coastal plains. Between 17:00 and 19:00 on their first day of flood relief operations, HMM-365 rescued 144 flood victims. Many of the rescues were accomplished by hoisting individuals from precarious positions in trees or on rooftops while being subjected to sporadic VC harassing fire. At the end of a 72-hour time period the squadron had successfully rescued over 1,500 flood victims. Squadron members were modifying three helicopters to carry a new weapons system. The TK-1, an externally mounted combination of M60 machine guns and 2.75-inch (70 mm) rocket launchers, that was first used in support of a Tiger Flight mission conducted just south of the Song Thu Bon, about 17 miles (27 km) from Da Nang. Two armed UH-34Ds expended 90 rockets and 500 rounds of 7.62 mm ammunition on enemy positions during pre-landing strikes. The squadron executed similar operations the following day. The squadron remained at Da Nang until 17 February 1965.

On 17 February 1965 HMM-163 redeployed as the Shufly squadron and was there when the 9th Marine Expeditionary Brigade landed at Red Beach on 8 March 1965. With the introduction of Marine combat units into South Vietnam, MAG-16 was deployed to Da Nang Air Base and Shufly operations were subsumed within the operations of MAG-16.

== Participating squadrons ==
The following Marine medium helicopter squadrons took part in Operation Shufly between 15 April 1962 and 8 March 1965. Squadron commanding officer are also listed:

- HMM-362 - 15 April 1962 - 31 July 1962 - LtCol Archie J. Clapp
- HMM-163 - 1 August 1962 - 11 January 1963 - LtCol Robert L. Rathbun
- HMM-162 - 12 January 1963 - 7 June 1963 - LtCol Reinheardt Leu
- HMM-261 - 8 June 1963 - 1 October 1963 - LtCol Frank A. Shook
- HMM-361 - 2 October 1963 - 31 January 1964 - LtCol Thomas J. Ross
- HMM-364 - 1 February 1964 - 21 June 1964 - LtCol John H. LaVoy
- HMM-162 - 17 June 1964 - 7 October 1964 - LtCol Oliver W. Curtis
- HMM-365 - 8 October 1964 - 7 March 1965 - LtCol Joseph Koler Jr.
