= VMM-362 =

Marine Medium Tiltrotor Squadron 362
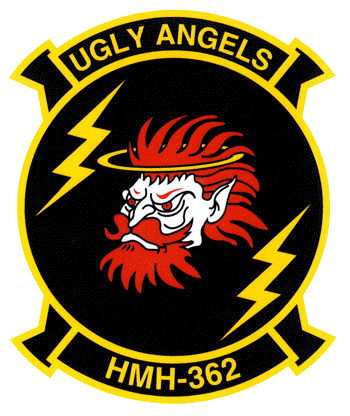
- HMH-362 insignia
- Active: 30 April 1952 – 30 November 2012; 17 August 2018 – present
- Allegiance: United States of America
- Branch: United States Marine Corps
- Type: MV-22
- Role: Assault support
- Part of: Marine Aircraft Group 16; 3rd Marine Aircraft Wing
- Garrison/HQ: Marine Corps Air Station Miramar
- Nicknames: "Ugly Angels" "Dogma" "Archie's Angels" "Big Kahuna" "Dust Devil" "Payload" "Provider" "Legacy"
- Motto: "Semper Malus" - Always Ugly
- Tail Code: YL
- Mascot: "Olaf"
- Engagements: Vietnam War; Operation Desert Storm; Operation Uphold Democracy; Operation Iraqi Freedom; Operation Enduring Freedom

Marine Medium Tiltrotor Squadron 362 (VMM-362) is a United States Marine Corps squadron that operates MV-22 Osprey. The squadron, known as the "Ugly Angels", was reactivated on 17 August 2018 at Marine Corps Air Station Miramar, California.

== Mission ==
Support the Marine Air-Ground Task Force Commander by providing assault support transport of combat troops, and equipment, day or night under all weather conditions during Expeditionary, Joint, or Combined operations.

== History ==
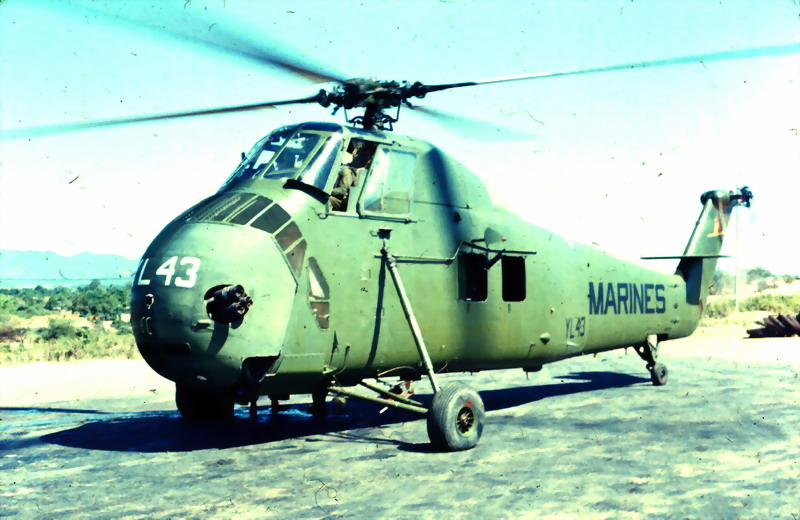
A UH-34 Huss from HMH-362 in Vietnam.

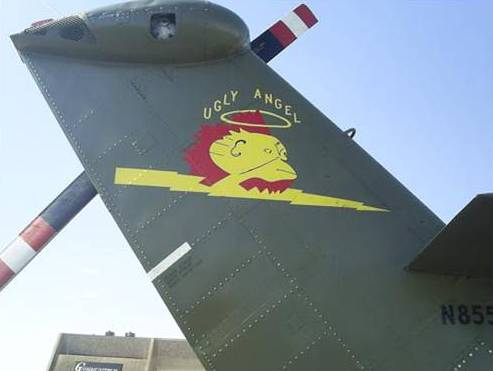
Original Olaf painted on tail of a UH-34 Huss

The squadron was originally established as HMR-362 on 20 April 1952 as part of Marine Helicopter Transport Group 36 (MAG(HR)-36) which was established on 2 June 1952. The squadron was initially equipped with the Sikorsky HRS.

In the early 1960s HMM-362 formed part of Marine Aircraft Group 16 (MAG-16) at Marine Corps Air Station Futenma. On 1 January 1962 it embarked on USS Princeton. In late March the squadron participated in SEATO Exercise Tulungan in the Philippines, on the conclusion of that exercise it embarked on the Princeton and went to Naval Air Station Cubi Point to exchange some helicopters with HMM-261.

=== Vietnam War ===
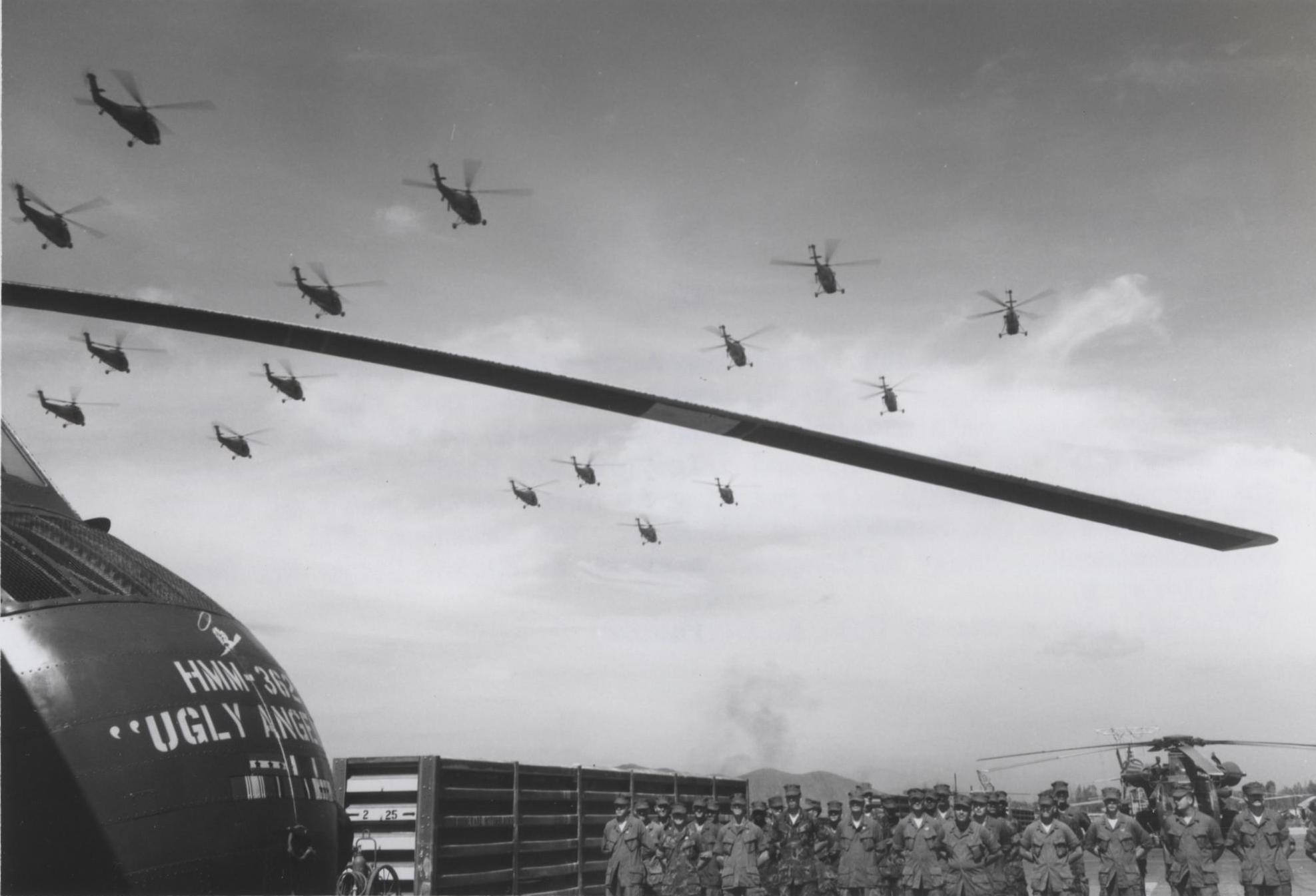
HMM-362 the last UH-34D squadron in South Vietnam makes a final fly-by during decommissioning ceremonies at Phu Bai Combat Base, 18 August 1969

The squadron served as the first Marine aircraft unit in South Vietnam. The squadron went ashore with their Sikorsky UH-34s on 15 April 1962 from the Princeton landing at Sóc Trăng Airfield in the Mekong Delta. The squadron was reinforced by three Cessna OE-1 observation aircraft and one R4D. This mission codenamed Operation Shufly was to increase the mobility of Army of the Republic of Vietnam (ARVN) units fighting the Vietcong (VC) in the rice producing Delta region. The squadron was commanded by Lieutenant Colonel Archie Clapp and it gained the nickname "Archie’s Angels". The nickname evolved to "Ugly Angels" that gave HMM/HMH-362 their well-known call sign. The squadron conducted their first operation on 22 April lifting soldiers from the ARVN 7th Division. On 24 April the squadron supported the ARVN 21st Division in Operation Nightingale near Cần Thơ, during this operation VC fire hit a UH-34 severing a hydraulic line forcing it to make an emergency landing, but the helicopter was repaired and flown out. In June the squadron developed the concept of the Eagle Flight where four Marine helicopters loaded with about 50 ARVN soldiers circled above an operational area on alert for any VC attempting to evade the ground forces. Once the VC were located, often by the OE-1 observation aircraft, the helicopters would land the ARVN soldiers at a position where they could block the VC escape. On 1 August 1962 the squadron was replaced by HMM-163 as the Shufly squadron at Sóc Trăng.

On 1 February 1964 the squadron replaced HMM-361 as the Shufly squadron at Da Nang Air Base. During this deployment the squadron trained Republic of Vietnam Air Force (RVNAF) pilots how to fly the UH-34 in preparation for the establishment of RVNAF UH-34 squadrons.

On 11 August 1965 the USS Princeton left Long Beach, California, with the squadron onbord. The squadron deployed to South Vietnam from 2 September to 31 December 1965. During this time it supported Operation Harvest Moon.

From 6 January to 8 April 1966 the squadron was part of the Special Landing Force (SLF) aboard USS Valley Forge. In late January the squadron supported Operation Double Eagle landing the Battalion Landing Team (BLT) 2nd Battalion, 3rd Marines. The squadron returned to SLF duty from 28 September to 31 December 1966 aboard USS Iwo Jima.

The squadron continued with SLF duty until 18 January 1967. During this time it supported Operation Deckhouse V. The squadron joined MAG-36 at Phu Bai Combat Base on 19 January. The squadron returned to SLF duty with SLF Alpha from 28 June to 7 September. During this time it supported Operation Buffalo. On 8 September the squadron joined MAG-16 at Marble Mountain Air Facility, but on 16 October it rejoined MAG-36.

From late January 1968 the squadron supported the Battle of Khe Sanh. Several squadron UH-34s would be kept on standby in revetments at Khe Sanh Combat Base in January–February to conduct emergency medevac and resupply missions. On 18 April 1968 the squadron joined SLF Alpha from MAG-36. The squadron ended SLF duty on 5 September 1968 and rejoined MAG-16. On 11 October during Operation Maui Peak a squadron helicopter #58-1387 taking off flew into the bottom of an HMM-265 CH-46 resupply helicopter Bu 151917, both crashed killing all nine Marines onboard. The squadron rejoined SLF Alpha on 8 December 1968 on USS Okinawa.

The squadron continued with SLF duty until 25 May 1969 when it rejoined MAG-36. On its return to shore the squadron was assigned to support the 9th Marine Amphibious Brigade. The squadron would fly the last combat missions of the UH-34 and on 18 August 1969 they held a ceremony at Phu Bai marking the end of its combat role. On 21 August the squadron was assigned to Fleet Marine Force Atlantic. The squadron would reform at Marine Corps Air Station New River, North Carolina, where they would transition to the CH-53 Sea Stallion and be redesignated as HMH-362.

HMM-362 lost a total of 33 Marines during their years of supporting combat operations in South Vietnam.

=== Post Vietnam ===
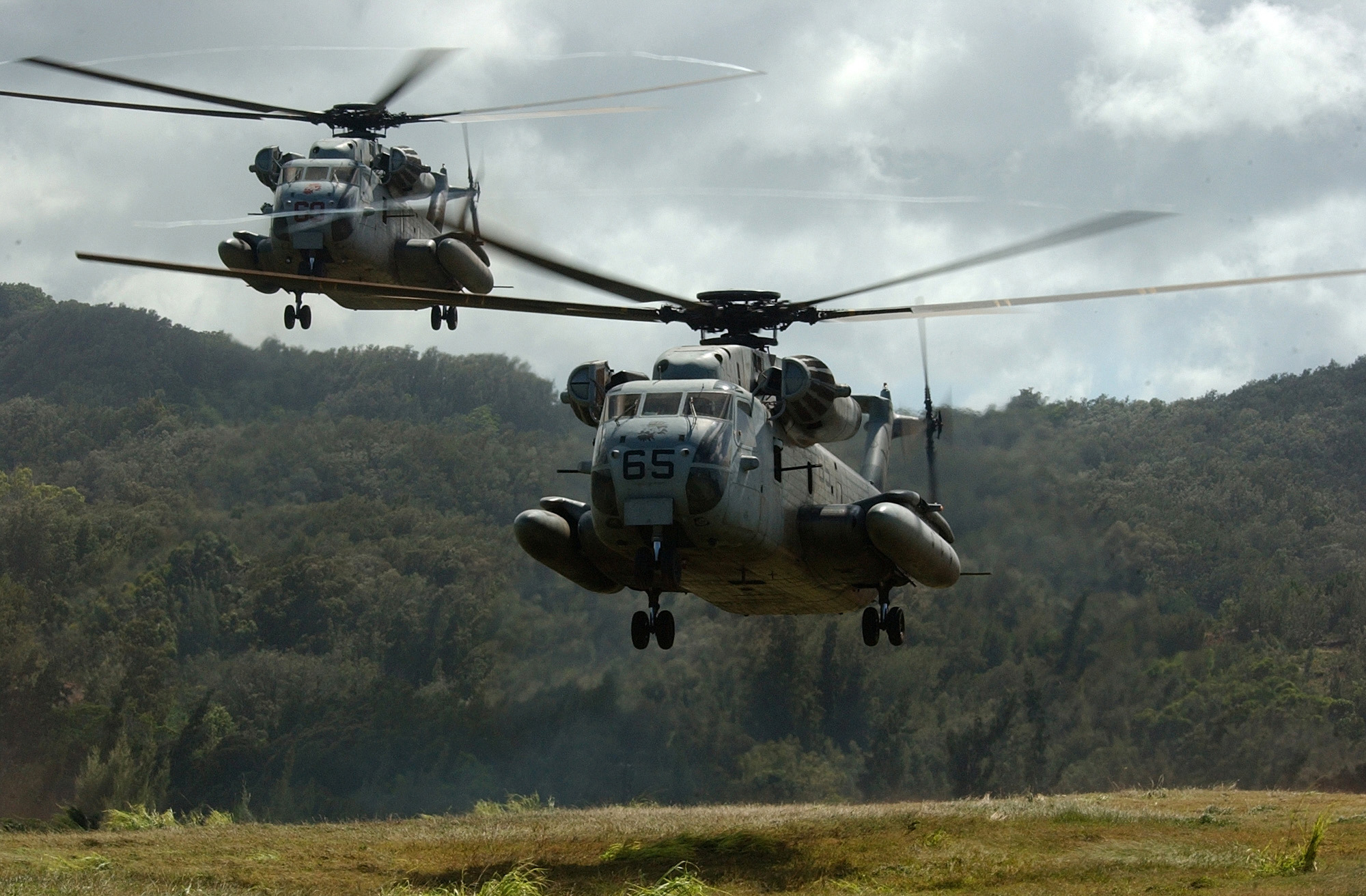
2 CH-53D helicopters from HMH-362 coming into a landing zone.

The squadron relocated from Santa Ana, California to Vietnam in 1962 as part of Marine Aircraft Group 36, 3d Marine Aircraft Wing. From 1969 through 1995 the squadron was located at Marine Corps Air Station New River, NC and was under MAG-26, 2d MAW, II MEF. It was during this time that the squadron was officially re-designated Marine Heavy Helicopter Squadron 362.

During the early 1990s the squadron deployed to Saudi Arabia for Operation Desert Storm. In 1993 the squadron deployed aboard the USS Theodore Roosevelt (CVN-71) with 6x CH-53D's and 4x UH-1N helicopters as part of a Special Purpose Marine Air Ground Task Force (SPMAGTF). In 1994 the squadron served as the Aviation Combat Element aboard the USS Wasp (LHD-1) in support of Operation Uphold Democracy in Haiti. Shortly after, In 1995 HMH-362 relocated to MCAF Kaneohe Bay, Hawaii as part of Marine Aircraft Group 24, 1st Marine Aircraft Wing.

=== Global war on terror ===
In March 2002, HMH-362 opened a new chapter when it became the first CH-53D squadron from MAG-24 assigned to the Marine Corps’ Unit Deployment Program at Marine Corps Air Station Iwakuni, Japan for a six-month period. Within 48 hours of their arrival in the western Pacific, the Ugly Angels embarked on a four-month, island-hopping tour known within the 1st Marine Aircraft Wing as the "Fishhook," so named for the shape of its stops in various Southeast Asian nations. Operating as the Aviation Combat Element (ACE) in five countries for Landing Force Cooperation Afloat Readiness and Training (LF CARAT) 2002, the squadron played an essential role in the Commander's, U.S. Pacific Command Theater Engagement Plan. During this period, the Ugly Angels flew over 7,100 nautical miles from mainland Japan through the Republic of the Philippines, Brunei, Singapore, and Malaysia to Utapao, Thailand, before redeploying to Iwakuni. The total distance covered by HMH-362's helicopters exceeded that of a flight from New York to Hong Kong. HMH-362 ended 2002 with a culmination of over 59,000 Class A mishap-free flight hours.

After returning to Kaneohe Bay in 2002, HMH-362 resumed its assault support mission throughout the Hawaiian Islands. In September 2003, HMH-362 once again returned to the Western Pacific in support of the Unit Deployment Program, deploying with eight CH-53D aircraft to MCAS Iwakuni, Japan. Over the six-month period, the squadron participated in exercises in the Republic of the Philippines. Additionally, the squadron deployed two separate training detachments to the Republic of Korea in January 2004. In March 2004, HMH-362 returned to the Republic of Korea in support of Exercise Foal Eagle. Additional high lights from UDP ’03-’04 included a three-week training detachment to the Japanese island of Okinawa, and support of Exercise Yamasakura on mainland Japan. HMH-362 redeployed to its home station of MCB Kaneohe Bay in April 2004 to resume its assault support mission in the Hawaiian Islands.

The Ugly Angels embarked on its third UDP tour in the spring of 2005, spending six months aboard MCAS Futenma in Okinawa, Japan. That summer, one-half of the squadron was attached to the aviation combat element for the 31st Marine Expeditionary Unit (31st MEU) and participated in the Philippines Bilateral Exercise (PHIBLEX) aboard the USS Essex (LHD-2). In November 2005, the squadron conducted a presidential support mission during which it flew logistical support missions for the Commander-in-Chief’s visit to Osaka, Japan. The squadron’s flawless execution of that mission prompted a second presidential support operation the following February in Hyderabad, India. In July, 2006, HMH-362 operated aboard the USS Bonhomme Richard (LHD-6) as the aviation combat element for the RIMPAC exercise 2006.

=== Operation Iraqi Freedom ===
2007 would see HMH-362 participate in its first major combat operation since Desert Storm. On 3 April, the Ugly Angels departed MCAS Kaneohe Bay, Hawaii for a planned seven-month tour aboard Al Asad Airbase in western Iraq as part of OIF 06-08. The squadron officially assumed their mission following a transfer of authority from HMH-363 on 13 April, and subsequently flew over 380 combat flight hours in the first two weeks in the Al Anbar Province.

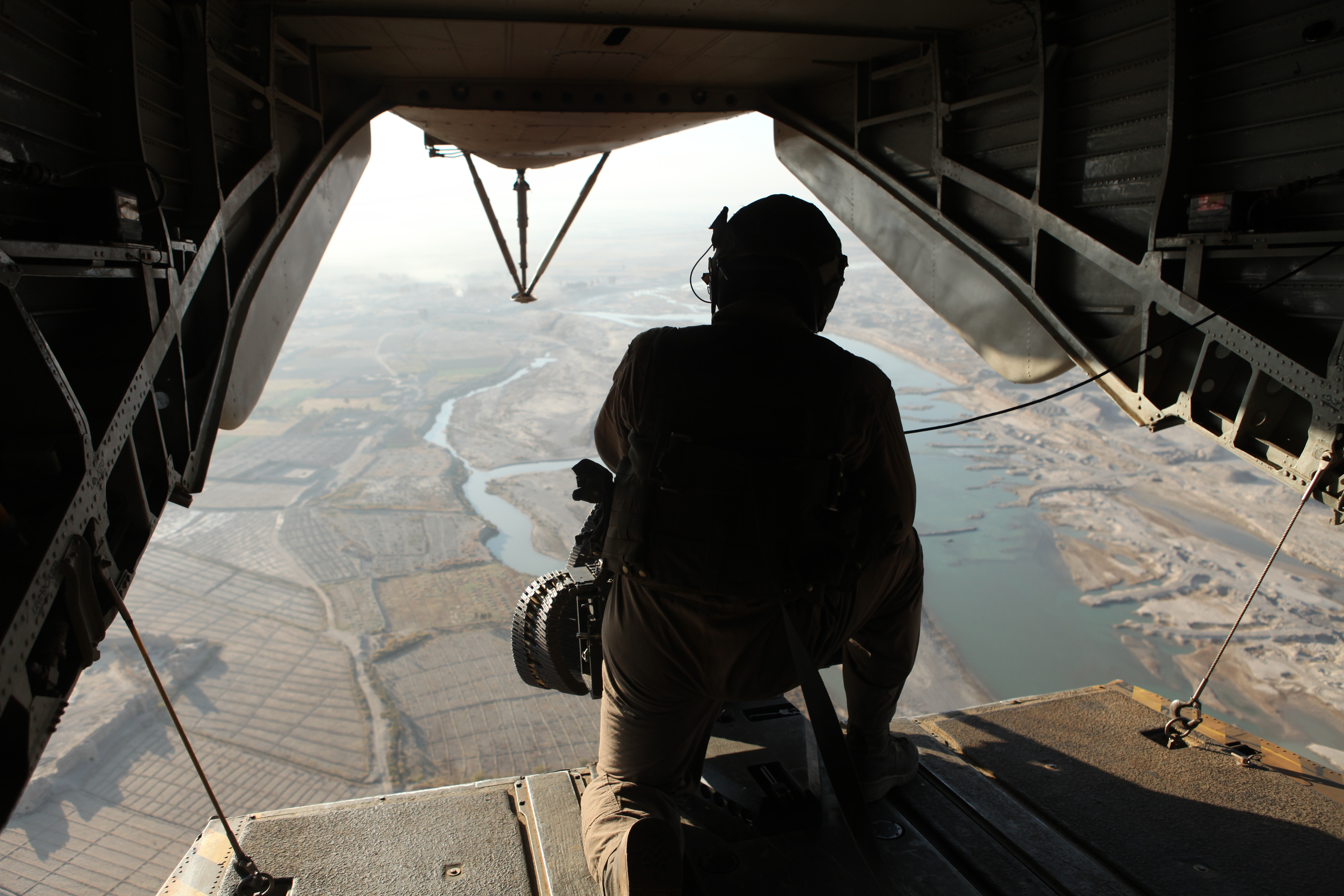
Tail gunner looking over the Helmand River Valley in Afghanistan

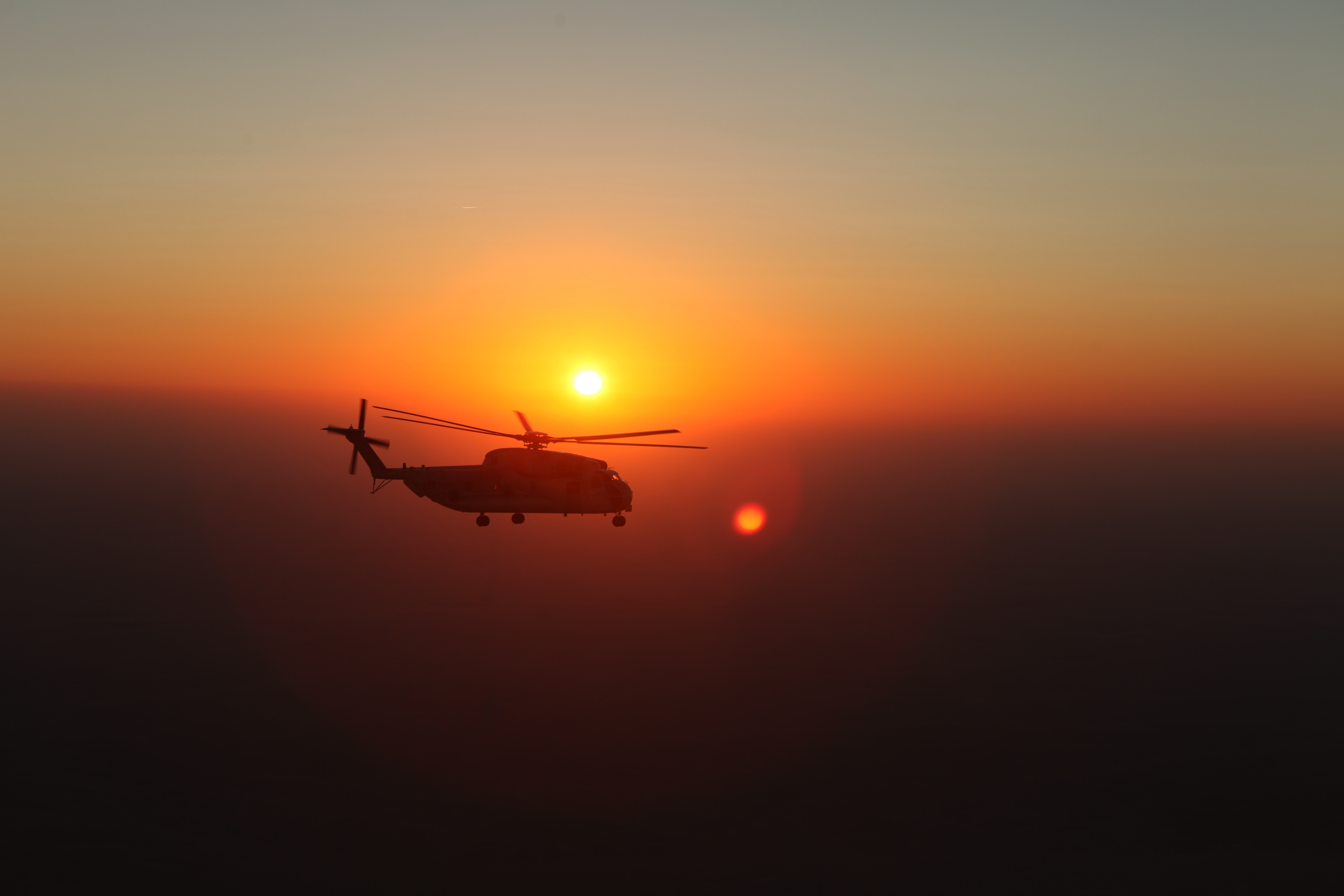
CH-53D Flying a Mission in Afghanistan at sunrise

The "Ugly Angels" remained there for seven months and returned in November 2007. During the deployment, HMH-362 became the first heavy lift helicopter squadron in OIF to incorporate the "Aeroscout" mission. The Marine Corps Aviation Association honored the "Ugly Angels" by awarding the squadron the Keith B. McCutcheon Award as Marine Heavy Helicopter Squadron of the Year.

== Operation Iraqi Freedom to Operation Enduring Freedom ==
On 23 January 2009, the squadron was again deployed to Al Asad Airbase, in Iraq in support of OIF. Early into their deployment however their tasking was changed and the squadron was redeployed to Kandahar International Airport in Afghanistan as part of Special Purpose Marine Air Ground Task Force - Afghanistan and later Marine Aircraft Group 40 which is the aviation combat element of the 2nd Marine Expeditionary Brigade. For this high altitude deployment the T64-GE-413 engines of the squadron's CH-53Ds were upgraded to the T64-GE-416 engine which is used in the CH-53E Super Stallion. The squadron arrived in Afghanistan on 15 April and began supporting combat operations on 22 April. The squadron moved from Kandahar International Airport to operate from Camp Bastion on 17 May and resumed operations on 18 May. The Ugly Angels provided assault support as part of Operation Kanjari, a heliborne insert of approximately 4,000 Marines into the heart of Taliban country in the Helmand River Valley earning the most prestigious U.S. unit award for combat gallantry, the Presidential Unit Citation. The squadron returned to Marine Corps Base Hawaii on 18 August 2009, 40 years to the day after receiving their first CH-53. The squadron did not receive any enemy caused damage throughout the entire deployment.

=== Operation Enduring Freedom ===
Following an extremely safe and successful combat tour, the Ugly Angels conducted a Change of Command on 15 Sep 2009 and quickly transitioned from combat operations to garrison operations that would focus on a robust Pre-deployment Training Program (PTP). This training plan would be executed over a compressed 10-month timeline. During this PTP cycle, the Ugly Angels supported Lava Viper, a joint operations live fire exercise on the Big Island of Hawaii within the U.S. Army's Pohakuloa Training Area, Weapons and Tactics course 2-10 and a desert training package at Marine Corps Station in Yuma, AZ. Toy for Tots were flown by Ugly Angels from Oahu to Molokai just in time for Christmas. The squadron conducted the first external lift of an 11th Marines M777A2 cannon at the Marine Corps Base Hawaii airfield in 2010. Gunnery Sergeant Donald Wilson was recognized as the 2010 Marine Corps Aviation Associations "Willie D. Sproule" Maintenance Marine of the year and Sergeant Steve Boungnadeth was recognized as 2010 MCAA Paul G. Vess' Avionics Marine of the year.

The Ugly Angels would again deploy to the Helmand Province from August 2010 to March 2011. In August 2010 the Ugly Angles departed Hawaii for Camp Bastion to conduct a Relief in Place (RIP) with fellow Hawaiian squadron HMH-363. On 7 September 2010, during a Transfer of Authority (TOA) ceremony on the Bastion flight line the Ugly Angels assumed the CH-53D mission from the Red Lions. The squadron of 190 Marines and Sailors operated from Camp Bastion, Afghanistan, during Operation ENDURING FREEDOM 10.2 in support of 3d Marine Aircraft Wing (Forward), I Marine Expeditionary Force (Forward), Regional Command Southwest. The Ugly Angels provided day and night all weather professional assault support to Marine Corps Infantry and coalition partners under the call sign of "Provider."

The Ugly Angels immediately surged to support the Afghanistan national elections. Multiple flights were flown in support of polling centers and the movement of Afghanistan officials throughout the Helmand Province. Highlights of the deployment were the support of over 20 named operations. The employment for the first time of the GAU-21/A 0.50 Cal Medium Window Pintle Connection Weapon System mounted in both the left and right forward windows. This weapon system is also used with the Ramp Mounted Weapon System. Aircraft 51 (Buno 157748) attained 10,000 flight hours, the Ugly Angel Games, the airfield movement of all squadron aircraft and spaces from the old Bastion flight line to the newly built Bastion flight line and multiple Aero-Hunter Missions with 3rd Battalion, 25th Marines. Many Distinguished Visitors spent time with the Ugly Angels from the 35th Commandant of the Marine Corps General James F. Amos, the Commanding General 3d MAW (FWD), and the Commanding General 1st Marine Division (FWD).

The Ugly Angels were recognized for excellence and continued their relationships with friends and families throughout the deployment. The Secretary of the Navy awarded the Ugly Angels as the 2010 Navy and Marine Corps aviation squadron for safety and excellence. Lt Sarah Ballard, US Navy, was selected as the Operational Flight Surgeon of the year 2010, Corporal Yevgeniy Levin participated in a naturalization ceremony in Kandahar, the squadron flew American Flags for the U.S. Bobsled Team and Sergeant Joshua Obermier was recognized as the 2011 Marine Corps Aviation Associations James E. Nicholson Non-Commissioned Leadership award.

The Ugly Angels conducted a RIP/TOA with fellow Hawaiian squadron HMH-463 "Pegasus" on 10 March 2011 and redeployed to Hawaii after supporting Regional Command Southwest with over 4200 sorties, safety delivered over 17,000 passengers and 2.3 million pounds of cargo. The maintenance department conducted over 68,000 maintenance man-hours and 21 aircraft phase inspections. The squadron had two aircraft sustain battle damage during the deployment.

On 18 March 2010, the entire squadron was reunited in Hawaii and on 8 April 2010 the last Change of Command ceremony was held aboard Marine Corps Base Hawaii. The Ugly Angels immediately began another aggressive PTP cycle. The Ugly Angels returned to Afghanistan in 2012, marking the final combat deployment for the CH-53D.

HMH-362 was deactivated on 30 November 2012.

== Reactivation as Tiltrotor Squadron ==
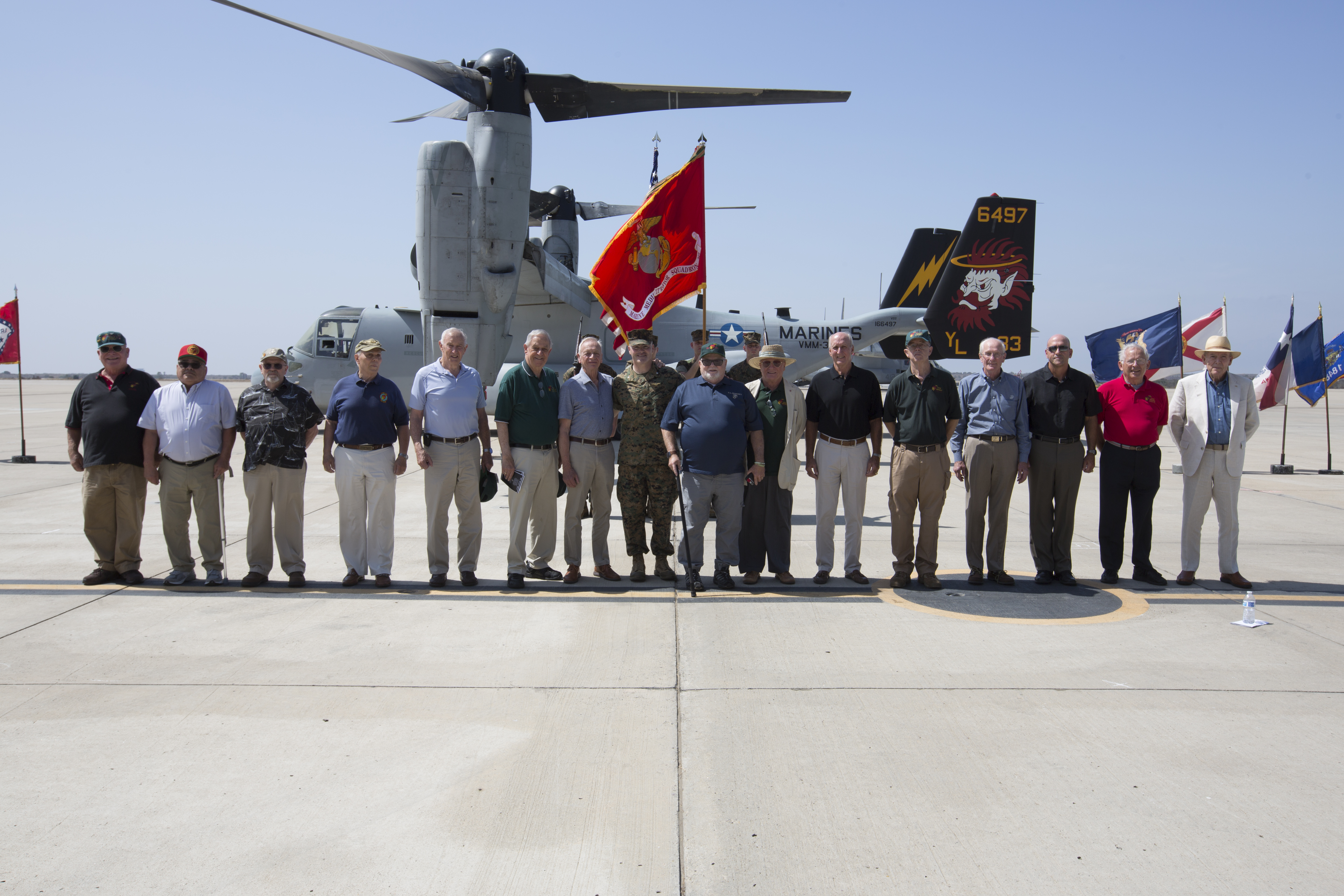
VMM-362 activation with former HMH-362 members

U.S. Army soldiers assigned to the East African Response Force, Task Force Seminole, fly onboard an MV-22B Osprey from VMM-362 near Camp Lemonnier, Djibouti, Sept. 20, 2026 in support of a mass casualty exercise with French partners.

Marine Medium Tiltrotor Squadron 362 (VMM-362) was reactivated at a ceremony aboard Marine Corps Air Station Miramar on August 17, 2018. The squadron was able to achieve Full Operational Capability as a V-22 squadron on February 28, 2020.

== Historical "Ugly Angel" Patches ==
Archies Angels Patch

Olaf during Vietnam War

Olaf of HMM-362

Routine Medevac Patch

Olaf of HMH-362

Olaf of HMH-362

Olaf of HMH-362

== Unit awards ==
A unit citation or commendation is an award bestowed upon an organization for the action cited. Members of the unit who participated in said actions are allowed to wear on their uniforms the awarded unit citation. HMH-362 has been presented with the following awards:

Streamer	Award	Year(s)	Additional Info
	Presidential Unit Citation Streamer with three Bronze Stars	1965–1967, 2009	Vietnam, OPERATION ENDURING FREEDOM - Afghanistan
	Navy Unit Commendation Streamer with one Silver and one Bronze Star	1962,1965–1966,1968–1969	Vietnam
	Meritorious Unit Commendation Streamer with four Bronze Stars	1968–1969, 1987–1988, 1993, 1996–1998	
	National Defense Service Streamer with three Bronze Stars	1962–1969, 1991, 2001–present	Vietnam War, Gulf War, war on terrorism
	Vietnam Service Streamer with two Silver Stars and one Bronze Star		Vietnam
	Southwest Asia Service Streamer with two Bronze Stars		
	Iraq Campaign Streamer with two Bronze Stars	2007, 2009	Iraq
	Afghanistan Campaign Streamer with one Bronze Star	2009, 2010–2011	Afghanistan
	Global War on Terrorism Service Streamer	2001–present	
	Vietnam Cross of Gallantry with Palm Streamer		Vietnam

== See also ==
- United States Marine Corps Aviation
- List of active United States Marine Corps aircraft squadrons
- List of inactive United States Marine Corps aircraft squadrons
