= List of aviation shootdowns and accidents during the Iraq War =

This list of aviation shootdowns and accidents during the Iraq War includes incidents with Coalition and civilian aircraft during the Iraq War.

According to media reports, 129 helicopters and 24 fixed-wing aircraft were lost in Iraq between the 2003 invasion and February 2009. Of these incidents, 46 have been attributed to hostile fire, such as anti-aircraft artillery and surface-to-air missiles. In March 2007, Brig. Gen. Stephen Mundt said that 130 helicopters had been lost in both Iraq and Afghanistan, about a third to hostile fire, and he was concerned that they were not being replaced fast enough. A report published in Aircraft Survivability in Summer 2010 gave a total of 375 U.S. helicopters lost in Iraq and Afghanistan up to 2009. Of these, 70 were downed by hostile fire, while the other 305 losses have been classified as non-hostile or non-combat events.

No unmanned aircraft of any type are included in the list below.

At least 283 people have died in helicopter crashes since the invasion, and 19 in fixed-wing crashes.

Since the beginning of the invasion helicopters were the target of attacks with "aerial improvised explosive devices" or home-made bombs. In early 2007, the U.S. Army announced that the Iraqi insurgent groups had developed a strategy for attacking American helicopters. This was confirmed by documents captured from Iraqi insurgents. U.S. deputy commanding general Jim Simmons said that the average month in 2006 and 2007 saw about 17 attacks against helicopters. Efforts to reduce losses included more training for helicopter pilots and improvements in tactics and aircraft defenses. In the fall of 2007, the U.S. military deployed the more advanced V-22 Osprey tiltrotor aircraft. According to the U.S. military, this aircraft flies much higher and faster than helicopters and has six to seven times more survivability than the widely used CH-46.

== Rotary-wing aircraft ==
=== 2010 ===
- 28 July – An Iraqi military Mil Mi-17 helicopter crashes in a sandstorm. All five crew-members are killed.
- 17 April – A UH-60 Blackhawk helicopter, 95–26648, belonging to the 3-158th Assault Helicopter Battalion, 12th Combat Aviation Brigade crashes on infill about 12 miles (19 km) north of Tikrit while executing an 8 ship air assault at night. 1 U.S. service member killed and 3 crew members injured.
- 21 February – An OH-58 Kiowa helicopter crashes in northern Iraq killing the two pilots on board.

=== 2009 ===
- 9 November – An OH-58 Kiowa experiences a hard landing north of Baghdad in Saladin Governorate. Two U.S. Army pilots are killed. They were assigned to the 2nd Squadron, 6th Cavalry Regiment, 25th Combat Aviation Brigade, 25th Infantry Division, Schofield Barracks.
- 19 September – One U.S. service member is killed and 12 others injured when a UH-60 Blackhawk helicopter goes down inside of Joint Base Balad.
- (2) 26 January – Two OH-58 Kiowas collide near Kirkuk while evading enemy fire, killing four soldiers.

=== 2008 ===
- 15 November – An OH-58 Kiowa Warrior strikes a tower near Mosul killing the 2 pilots.
- (2) 4 October – Two American UH-60 Black Hawk helicopters collide while trying to land in Baghdad. An Iraqi soldier is killed, and two Iraqis and three Americans injured. The incident is ascribed to mechanical failure.
- 18 September – A Polish Air Force Mi-24 crashes and is damaged beyond repair in Iraq, the rotary wing airframe was destroyed by explosives.
- 18 September – A CH-47 Chinook en route to Balad from Kuwait crashes 62 miles (100 km) west of Basrah International Airport, killing seven U.S. soldiers.
- 1 June – A U.S. helicopter crashes south of Baghdad, injuring two soldiers. The type of helicopter is not revealed.
- 27 March – An Iraqi military Mil Mi-17 helicopter is shot down during heavy fighting in northern Basra.
- 4 March – An Iraqi military Mil Mi-17 helicopter crashes in a sandstorm south of Baiji (about 90 miles (140 km) south of Mosul in northern Iraq), killing an American airman and seven other people.

=== 2007 ===
- (4) 2007 – Four AH-64 Apache helicopters are destroyed on the ground by Iraqi insurgent mortar fire; the insurgents had made use of embedded coordinates in web-published photographs (geotagging) taken by soldiers to track the exact location of the helicopters.
- 20 November – A Royal Air Force HC.1 Puma ZA938 crashes. Two SAS troopers die after the troop transporter goes down in an urban area during a covert mission over Baghdad. Two other men from 22 Special Air Service Regiment are seriously injured in the crash although their condition is not thought to be life-threatening. A further seven SAS and three RAF personnel survive the impact and are rescued by Coalition forces.
- 22 August – An UH-60L Black Hawk 06-27077 crashes in northern Iraq, killing all 14 U.S. soldiers on board. The military says initial findings indicate that the aircraft had experienced a mechanical problem.
- 14 August – A CH-47D Chinook 89-00171 from B Company, 1–52 Aviation Regiment crashes near the al-Taqaddum air base west of Baghdad, killing five crew on board.
- 10 August – An U.S. Navy MH-60 "Rescue Hawk" makes a forced landing in Yusufiyah. Two U.S. Army soldiers sustained non-life-threatening injuries.
- 31 July – An AH-64 Apache goes down after coming under fire in eastern Baghdad. The two crew members are safely extracted.
- 4 July – An OH-58 Kiowa 95-0002 crashes into power lines in Mosul, killing the pilot and injuring the copilot.
- 2 July – OH-58D Kiowa 91-0560 from 3–17 Cavalry Regiment is shot down by small arms fire along a canal south of Baghdad, in Babil Governorate. Both pilots are rescued by strapping themselves onto the stub wings of an AH-64 Apache. The helicopter is later destroyed.
- 29 May – OH-58D(R) Kiowa 93-0978 from B Troop, 2–6 Cavalry Regiment is shot down between Baqubah and Muqdadiyah with small arms, killing the chopper's two pilots.
- (2) 15 April – Two British Aérospatiale Puma helicopters are involved in a mid-air collision near Taji, north of Baghdad. Both aircraft crash, with two personnel killed and one seriously injured.
- 5 April – An UH-60 Black Hawk carrying nine is shot down in Latifiya using anti-aircraft heavy machine guns, 4 were wounded.
- 1 March – An OH-58D Kiowa makes a hard landing south of Kirkuk, injuring both crewmembers, and becomes entangled in overhanging wires before hitting the ground. Reports had varied whether the crash was due to a mechanical or electronic failure and whether it is shot down.
- 22 February – An UH-60 Black Hawk crashes in an area north of Baquba City during a clash between gunmen and U.S. troops.
- 21 February – An UH-60 Black Hawk is hit by RPG and small arms fire north of Baghdad and makes a hard landing; all nine military personnel on board are rescued.
- 7 February – A CH-46E Sea Knight from HMM-364 is shot down by a shoulder-fired missile in al-Karma, outside Fallujah, killing all seven on board.
- 2 February – AH-64D Apache 02-5337 from A Company, 1st Battalion, 227th Aviation Regiment, 1st Air Cavalry Brigade, 1st Cavalry Division shot down by a combination of gunfire and a shoulder-fired missile, near Taji, killing the two pilots.
- 28 January – An AH-64D Apache from 4th Battalion, 227th Aviation Regiment, 1st Air Cavalry Brigade, 1st Cavalry Division, is shot down by hostile fire during the Battle of Najaf, killing the two pilots.
- 25 January – An UH-60 Black Hawk is shot down by gunfire near Hit. All aboard survive the incident.
- 20 January – An U.S. Army AH-64 Apache helicopter crashes near Najaf. One soldier is killed.
- 20 January – An UH-60 Black Hawk from C Company, 1–131 Aviation Regiment is shot down by a combination of several heavy machine guns and a shoulder-fired missile north-east of Baghdad. All 12 crew and passengers on board are killed in the incident.

=== 2006 ===
- 11 December – A CH-53E Super Stallion 164785 from HMH-465 carrying 21 personnel crashes in brownout conditions in Al Anbar Province, killing 1 and injuring 17. Helicopter was written off.
- 3 December – A CH-46E Sea Knight from HMM-165 carrying 16 personnel makes an emergency landing on Lake Qadisiyah in Al Anbar Province. Four of the passengers drown in the incident.
- 6 November – An AH-64D Apache from A Company, 1–82nd Attack Reconnaissance Battalion (ARB) attached to 25th Combat Aviation Brigade crashes north of Baghdad, killing the two pilots.
- 7 September – A CH-53D Sea Stallion (157146) from HMH-463 makes a nighttime hard landing in Al Anbar Province and is later written off.
- 8 August – A UH-60 Black Hawk 86-24535 from 82nd AAC (MEDEVAC) attached to 3rd MAW crashes in Anbar, killing two crew members and injuring four.
- 18 July – A Polish Air Force W-3WA Sokół crashes at an air base in Al Diwaniyah, injuring 4 crew and 3 passengers.
- 13 July – An AH-64D Apache from 4–4th Aviation Regiment is shot down south of Baghdad. The two pilots survive.
- 27 May – An AH-1W SuperCobra 164591 from HMLA-169 crashes into Lake Habbaniyah, killing the pilot and a maintenance ground crew member on board.
- 14 May – An AH-6M Little Bird (OH-6 Cayuse) from the 1–160th SOAR is shot down during combat operations in Yusufiyah, southwest of Baghdad, killing the two crewmen.
- 6 May – A Westland Lynx AH.7 (Royal Navy) from 847 Squadron is shot down with a SA-14 over Basra, killing five crewmen and crashing into a house.
- 1 April – An AH-64D Apache from 4–4th Aviation Regiment is shot down southwest of Baghdad, killing the two crewmen.
- 16 January – An AH-64D Apache 03-5385 from C Company, 1–4th Aviation Regiment is shot down north of Baghdad, killing the two pilots.
- 13 January – An OH-58D Kiowa 95-0021 from 1–10th Aviation Regiment is shot down outside Forward Operating Base Courage, near Mosul, killing the two pilots.
- 7 January – A UH-60L Black Hawk 91-26346 from B Company, 1–207th Aviation Regiment crashes near Tal Afar in bad weather, killing 12 people on board. Reports suggest it was not shot down.

=== 2005 ===
- 26 December – An AH-64D Apache 03-5375 from 1–4th Aviation Regiment collides with another Apache near Baghdad, both crewmembers are killed. Second AH-64 was not destroyed.
- 2 November – An AH-1W SuperCobra 165321 from HMLA-369 shot down near Ramadi, killing the two pilots.
- 29 August – An OH-58D #90-00377 from 4th SQDN 3ACR was engaged by enemy fire. TF Freedom pilot killed by SA fire near Tal Afar. The A/C took rounds and the PI was wounded and able to recover but had to make an emergency landing north of the city, he was unable to fly back. A/C was recovered by SP and MTP.
- 12 August – An AH-64A Apache 90-0442 from C Company, 8–229th Aviation Regiment crashes near Kirkuk, injuring both crewmembers. Helicopter is written off.
- 19 July – AH-64D Apache 02-5319 from 1–3rd Aviation Regiment crashes in Iraq, injuring the two pilots. Helicopter is written off.
- 2 July – A CH-47D Chinook 85-24335 from C Company/159th Aviation Brigade destroyed in a fire on the ground at Ramadi Camp.
- 27 June – An AH-64D Apache from 3–3rd Aviation Regiment is shot down by a shoulder-fired missile near Mishahda, killing the two pilots.
- 31 May – An Italian AB-412 helicopter crashes near Nasiriyah, killing the four soldiers on board.
- 26 May – An OH-58D(I) Kiowa 93-0989 from 1–17th Cavalry Regiment is shot down with small arms near Baquba, killing the two crewmen.
- 21 May – A CH-47D Chinook 87-00102 from B Company, 4–123rd Aviation Regiment crashes in Iraq due to failure of both engines. Five crewmen injured. Helicopter was blown in-place.
- 17 April – AH-64D Apache 03-5370 from 4th Squadron, 3d ACR makes hard landing near Baghdad.
- 3 March – A Westland Lynx Mk.8 of Royal Navy crashes during Gulf exercise. The three crew members survived. The Lynx was repaired and was later deployed to HMS Nottingham.
- 28 January – An OH-58 Kiowa 96-0019 from 1–7th Cavalry Regiment crashes in Baghdad after hitting electrical wires, killing the two crewmen.
- 26 January – A CH-53E Super Stallion 164536 from HMH-361 crashed in Al-Anbar province, killing 30 U.S. Marines and one Navy sailor.

=== 2004 ===
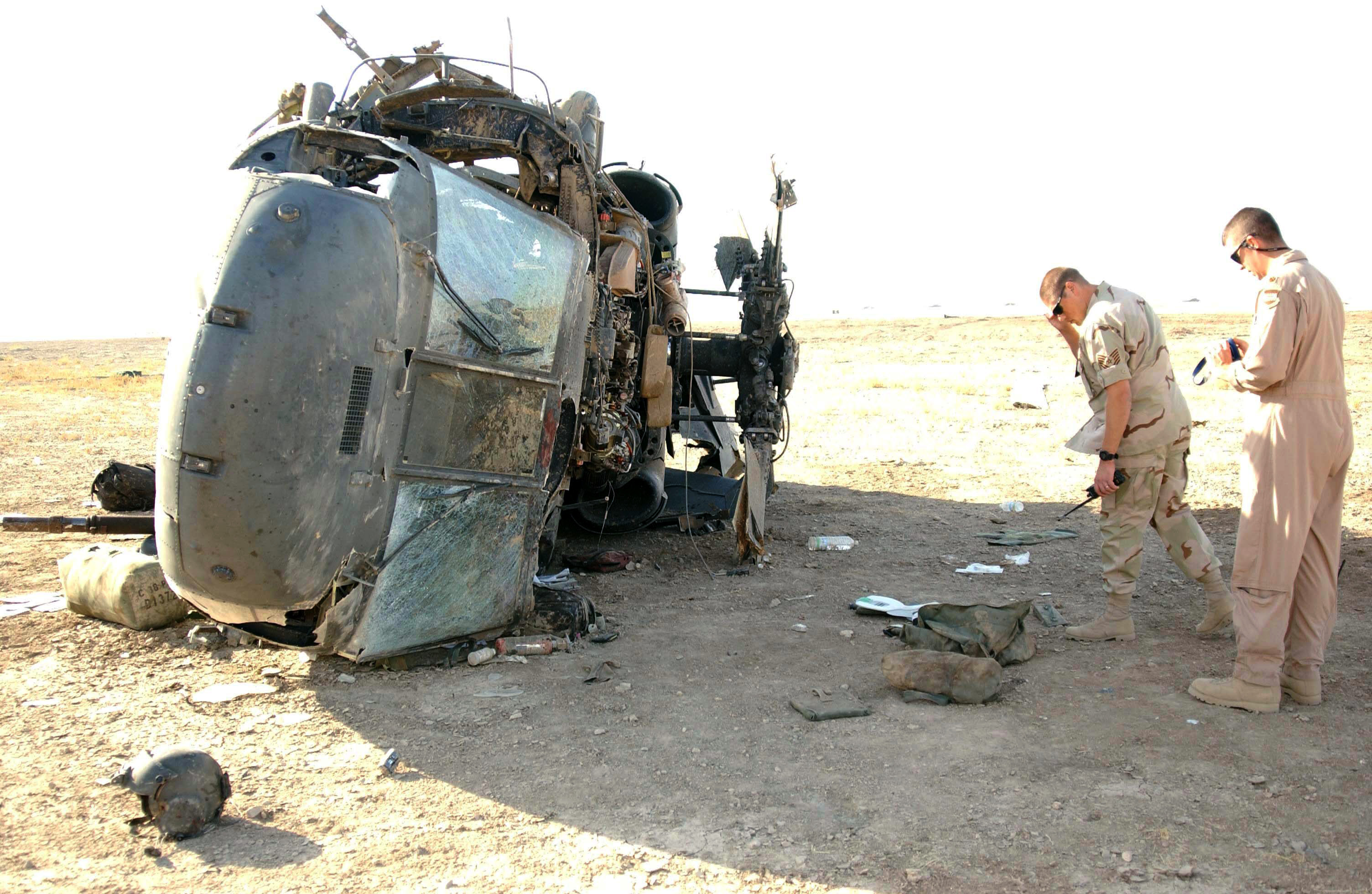
The UH-60 Black Hawk that crashed on 21 September 2004

- 15 December – A Polish W-3WA Sokół 0902 from 25 BKP crashes near Karbala due to pilot error; three Polish soldiers are killed and four injured.
- 9 December – AH-64A Apache 91-0012 from A Company, 1–151st Aviation Regiment hit a UH-60L Black Hawk 82-23668 from N Company/4-278th ACR on the ground at a Mosul base, killing the two Apache pilots and wounding four soldiers on board the Black Hawk. Both helicopters destroyed.
- 14 November – UH-60A Black Hawk 87-24602-from the 11th Aviation Regiment-Medevac northwest of Baghdad sustained heavy machine gun fire and multiple system malfunctions that required emergency landing at Camp Taji. All nine on board were not injured.
- 12 November – UH-60A Black Hawk from 1–106th Aviation Regiment was engaged by small arms fire and shot down by an RPG hitting the cockpit while flying at low altitude northeast of Baghdad, wounding three of the four crew members. The severely wounded co-pilot Tammy Duckworth would become a Senator of the United States for Illinois in 2017.
- 11 November – AH-1W SuperCobra 161021 from HMLA-169 is shot down by RPG and small arms fire near Fallujah. It is destroyed by Iraqi rebel forces, crew recovered intact.
- 9 November – US OH-58D Kiowa shot down by rocket fire over Fallujah.
- (2) 16 October – Two OH-58D Kiowas 94-0172 and 97-0130 from 1–25th Aviation Regiment collide near Baghdad, killing two pilots aboard the first craft, and wounding two aboard the other.
- 23 September – AH-64D Apache 02-5292 from B Company, 1–227th Aviation Regiment, 4th BCT, 1st Cavalry Division crashes near Tallil AB, Iraq when pilot loses control following tail rotor problem.
- 21 September – UH-60A Black Hawk 87-24579 from A Company, 1–244th Aviation Regiment crashes near Nasiriyah, wounding four crew members.
- 8 September – CH-46E Sea Knight 153372 Shot down by RPG Fire South of Camp Fallujah, crashes and is burned out near Al-Buaisa. All four crew members injured.
- 4 September – OH-58D Kiowa (3–17 CAV) shot down over Tal Afar, Iraq; both pilots safe. Incident highlighted in TV Documentary Kiowa Down.
- 11 August – CH-53E Super Stallion 164782 from HMM-166 (Reinforced) crashes in the Al-Anbar province, killing two Marines and wounding three others.
- 8 August – OH-58D(I) Kiowa 96-0015 made emergency landing north of Baghdad after being hit by RPG. Crew unhurt.
- 5 August – UH-1N Huey 160439 from HMM-166 shot down near Najaf; crew wounded. Helicopter was later written off.
- 28 July – A USMC AH-1W SuperCobra was hit by ground fire while supporting ground operations in Anbar province, killing the pilot, Lt. Col. David S. Greene. The copilot managed to land the helicopter.
- 19 July – Near Basra, a British HC.1 Aérospatiale Puma XW221 of 33 RAF Squadron crashes, killing one crewman and injuring two others.
- 24 June – AH-1W SuperCobra 163939 shot down in Fallujah; pilots safe.
- 12 June – OH-58D(R) Kiowa 94-0171 from A Company, 1–25th Aviation Regiment crashes north of Baghdad; both pilots safe.
- 26 April – OH-58D(I) Kiowa 91-0567 from P Troop, 4th Squadron, 2d ACR made emergency landing at Kut after engine problem and burned out. Both crewmembers safe.
- 16 April – CH-47D Chinook 92-0301 from C Company/193rd Aviation Brigade (Hawaii Army National Guard) makes hard landing during sandstorm and was later destroyed. Crew memberssafe.
- 12 April – MH-53M Pave Low 69-5797 of 16th SOW/20th SOS shot down by RPG near Fallujah, three on board are wounded. Helicopter was later destroyed.
- 11 April – An AH-64D Apache 02-5301 from C Company, 1–227 Aviation Regiment, 4th BCT, 1st Cavalry Division shot down west of Baghdad, killing both pilots.
- 7 April – OH-58D Kiowa crashes near Baquba after being hit by ground fire; pilots rescued.
- (2) 30 March – Two AH-1W SuperCobras 163947 and 164595 of HMLA-775 collide near Al Taqaddum, Iraq; pilots rescued. Both helicopters destroyed.
- 19 March – AH-6J, 25364, 1-160th, shot down in the vicinity of Amiriyah by a MANPADS while conducting precision close air support during day operation. Both pilots rescued by Special Operations forces and teamed up with the operators to hunt and kill the enemy missile shooters.
- 11 March – CH-46E Sea Knight 153389 from HMM-161 makes hard landing in brownout conditions in Al Anbar province; took additional damage during transportation and later was written off.
- 25 February – OH-58D(R) Kiowa 97-0124 crashes in Iraq with 4th Squadron, 3d ACR, after striking electrical wires west of Baghdad, killing the two pilots.
- 25 January – An OH-58D Kiowa (93-0957) from 3–17 Cavalry Regiment crashes into the Tigris River during a rescue mission, after hitting electrical wires, killing both pilots.
- 23 January – An OH-58D Kiowa (93-0950) from 3–17 Cavalry Regiment crashes just after take-off outside Mosul, killing both pilots.
- 13 January – AH-64 Apache from 4th Squadron, 3d Armored Cavalry Regiment shot down near Habbaniyah, pilots rescued.
- 8 January – A UH-60 Black Hawk (86-24488) from 571st Medical Company (Air Ambulance) shot down near Fallujah, killing 9 crew and passengers.
- 2 January – An OH-58D Kiowa 90-0370 from 1–17 Cavalry Regiment (assigned to 1–82 Aviation Brigade) shot down near Fallujah, killing a pilot.
- 1 January – UH-60L Black Hawk 93-26514 from 5–101st Aviation Regiment makes hard landing.

=== 2003 ===
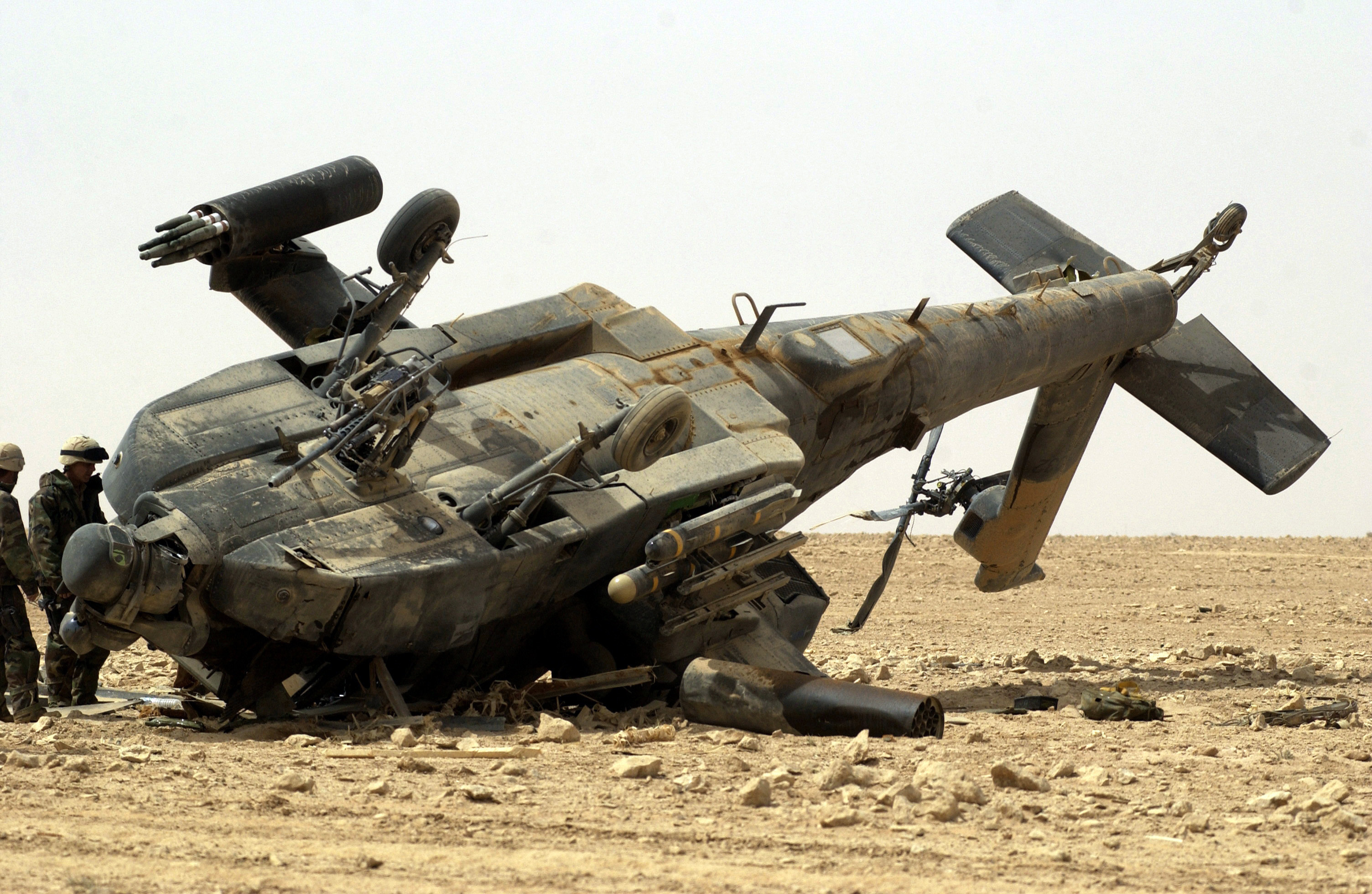
U.S. Army AH-64 Apache that crashed in central Iraq in November 2003.

- 11 December – AH-64D Apache from 1–101st Aviation Regiment crash-lands due to the APU clutch failing and starting a fire in flight and subsequently is burned to the ground 15 miles (24 km) south of Mosul. The pilots survived.
- 9 December – An OH-58 Kiowa helicopter is hit by a rocket-propelled grenade, forcing a crash landing. Both crewmembers survive.
- 25 November – OH-58D Kiowa 96-0040 crashes after its tail rotor struck ground.
- 21 November – OH-58D Kiowa 92-0605 from D Troop, 1–17 Cavalry Regiment written off, reason unknown.
- (2) 15 November – Two UH-60L Black Hawks from 4–101st Aviation Regiment (93-26531) and 9–101st Aviation Regiment (94-26548) collide and crash after one aircraft coming under fire; 6 and 11 soldiers (crew and passengers) on board are killed, respectively, and 5 others on board the first AC are injured in Mosul.
- 7 November – UH-60L Black Hawk 92-26431 from 5–101 Aviation Regiment shot down by a MANPAD near Tikrit; all four crew, and both passengers from the Department of the Army are killed.
- 2 November – Near Fallujah, CH-47D Chinook 91-0230 of Detachment 1/F Company/106th Aviation Brigade shot down with an SA-7 missile; 16 soldiers killed, 26 wounded.
- 30 October – AH-64D Apache 00-5211 (ex AH-64A 86–9009) of 6–6th Cavalry Regiment crashes near Balad AAF, Iraq, and burned out. Both crewmembers are safe.
- 25 October – UH-60L Black Hawk 96-26653 From B co. 3-158 Avn. Regt. of the 12th Avn. BDE crashes and burns out after being hit by an SA-7 missile near Tikrit, 1 soldier injured.
- 23 October – AH-64D Apache 00-5219 (ex AH-64A 86–8972) from 1–101st Aviation Regiment crashes in Iraq while approaching to land at Kirkuk. The APU clutch failed and started a fire in flight. Aircraft landed safely but fuselage was almost completely burnt through.
- 13 October – OH-58D Kiowa (93-0991) from C Troop, 1–17th Cavalry Regiment crashes inside Iraq, pilots survive.
- 7 October – OH-58D Kiowa (92-0578) crashes inside Iraq, pilots survive.
- 2 September – A soldier is killed as a UH-60L Black Hawk from 2–501st Aviation Regiment rolls over during a nighttime troop insertion southwest of Baghdad.
- 28 August – CH-47D Chinook 88-0098 from F Company/159th Aviation Brigade written off in Iraq.
- 14 August – AH-64D - 01-05241 (ex AH-64A 87–0507) - IRAQ - C Co, 1stBattalion, 4th Aviation, 4th ID Crashed while performing a maintenance test flight. Cause was the Intermediate Gearbox. Both pilots survived, but had extensive back injuries. The aircraft was cannibalized for parts and used as a trainer for ground personnel to extract downed aviators.
- 19 June – AH-64A Apache 87-0498 of R Troop, 4th Squadron, 3d ACR makes hard landing following inflight fire. Helicopter is written off.
- 12 June – AH-64D Apache of 101st Aviation Brigade helicopter shot down near Baghdad, both crewmembers survive.
- 19 May – CH-46E Sea Knight 156424 of HMM-364 crashes in Al-Hilla, killing four Marines; another Marine drowns trying to rescue the crew.
- 9 May – UH-60A Black Hawk 86-24507 of 571st Medical Company (AA) crashes into Tigris River, the vicinity of Samarrah, Iraq killing two pilots and crew chief. One more soldier was injured.
- 6 May – OH-58D Kiowa 94-0163 of N Troop, 4th Squadron, 3d ACR crashes near Al Asad and burns out. One crewmember injured.
- 30 April – A Marine CH-53E Super Stallion 162486 of HMH-465 crashes near Najaf and burns out. Crew escaped.
- 14 April – A Marine AH-1W SuperCobra 163940 of HMLA-169 crashes near Samarra, injuring both pilots. Helicopter was later destroyed.
- 6 April – UH-60 Black Hawk 93-26522 from B Company, 4–101st Aviation Regiment crashes inside Iraq, crew survive.
- 5 April – AH-1W SuperCobra 161020 of HMLA-267 crashes, killing both pilots.
- 2 April – A UH-60L Black Hawk (94-26557) of B Company, 2–3rd Aviation Regiment crashes near Karbala, killing 7 soldiers and injuring 4 more.
- 31 March – AH-64D Apache 84-24201 of C Company, 1–3rd Aviation Regiment crashes on landing in Iraq, injuring the two pilots. Helicopter was written off.
- 30 March – UH-1N Huey 160620 of HMLA-169 crashes; three men aboard die.
- (2) 28 March – Two AH-64D Apaches, 97-5032 of A Company and 98-5068 of B Company, 2–101st Aviation Regiment crash in Iraq; one pilot injured.
- 28 March – OH-58D Kiowa 95-0006 from A Troop, 2–17th Cavalry Regiment crashes in Iraq, pilots survive.
- 27 March – OH-58D Kiowa 95-0024 from C Troop, 2–17th Cavalry Regiment crashes in Iraq, pilots survive.
- 26 March – UH-1N Huey 160444 of HMLA-269 makes hard landing in sandstorm and is written off.
- 23 March – AH-64D Apache 85-25407 from C Company, 1st Battalion, 227th Aviation Regiment, 4th BCT, 1st Cavalry Division shot down during attack on Republican Guard; two pilots taken prisoner. Helicopter was supposedly destroyed by Coalition forces, but Iraqi TV showed an AH-64 being taken to Baghdad on a low loader.
- (2) 22 March – Two Royal Navy ASaC.7 Sea Kings XV650 'CU-182' and XV704 'R-186' of 849 Squadron/A Flight collide over the Persian Gulf, killing six British crew members and one American.
- 20 March – CH-46E Sea Knight 152579 of HMM-268 crashes in Kuwait 9 kilometres (5.6 mi) from Iraqi border, killing eight British marines of 42 CDO and four U.S. Marines.
- 19 March – MH-53M Pave Low 67-14993 of 20th SOS carrying special forces crashes in southern Iraq. No one is killed. The craft was later destroyed to prevent capture.

== Fixed-wing aircraft ==
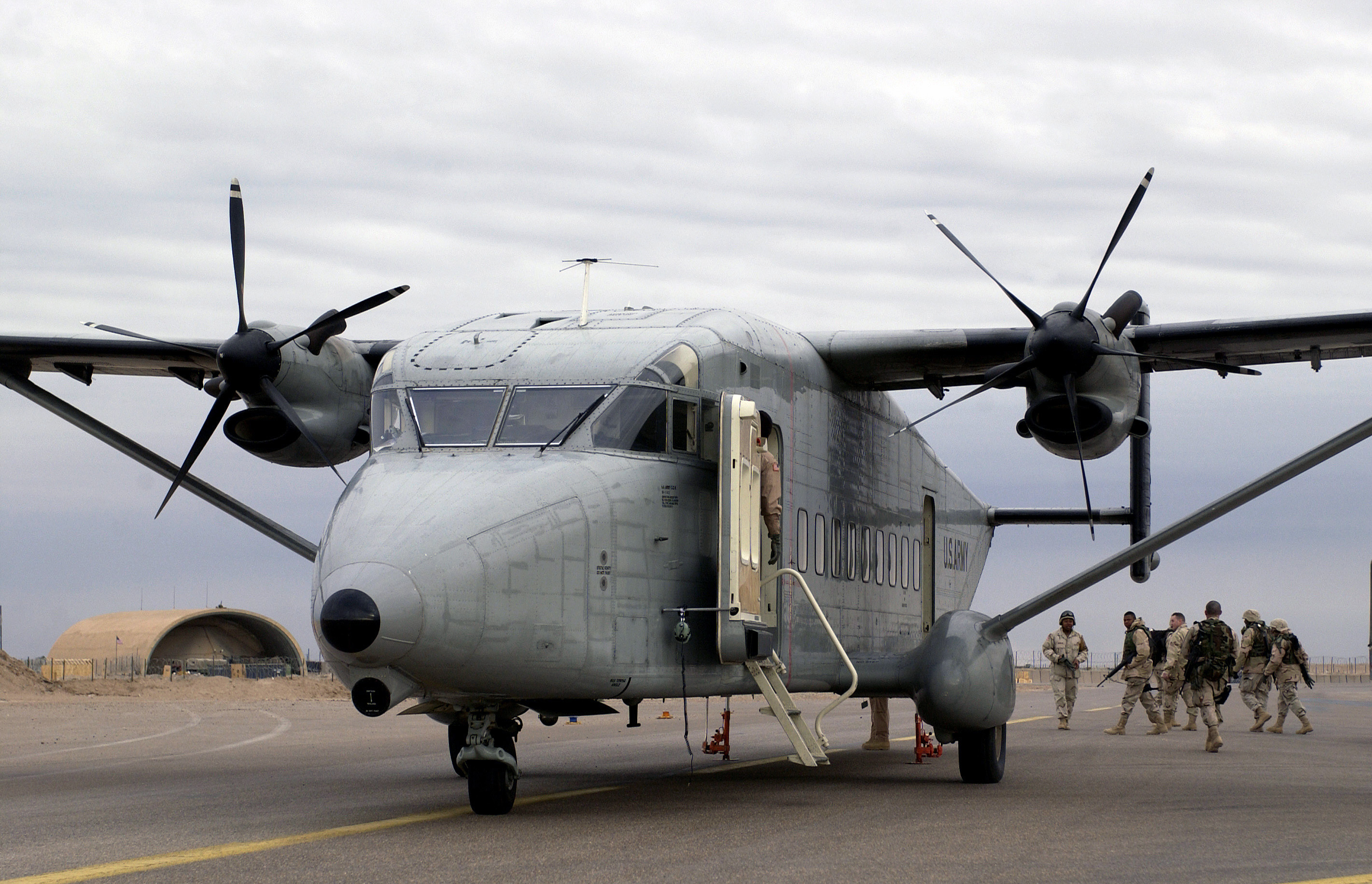
A C-23B Sherpa, similar to the one that crashed on 26 November 2008.

=== 2008 ===
- 26 November 2008 – A US Army C-23 Sherpa from 2–641 Aviation Brigade made a wheels up landing at al-Kut, while operating with Task Force 34. None of the four-man crew and seven passengers were injured.
- 12 November 2008 – A USAF F-16 caught fire on takeoff. The pilot survived.
- 27 June 2008 – A C-130 Hercules is damaged beyond repair in an emergency landing northeast of Baghdad International Airport. All 38 on board were transported to nearby Sather Air Base for medical evaluation. The aircraft was significantly damaged in the landing, and was deemed a write-off and destroyed.
- (2) 7 January 2008 – Two F/A-18 fighter jets operating from USS Harry S. Truman crashed during an Iraq-related mission in the Gulf. All three pilots were rescued.

=== 2007 ===
- 16 July 2007 – A US F-16, serial 92–3901, from the 35th FW crashed. The pilot survived. The crash was attributed to under-inflation of the landing gear tires.
- 15 June 2007 – A US F-16, serial 89–2031, from the Ohio ANG crashed on takeoff at night. The pilot, Maj. Kevin Sonnenberg, was killed. The cause was not hostile fire and is believed to be pilot spatial disorientation.
- 12 February 2007 – A British C-130 Hercules is destroyed by coalition forces after being heavily damaged in a night landing in southern Iraq; two are injured. The aircraft was struck by four improvised explosive devices placed by insurgents, upon landing at a temporary runway in Maysaan Province.

=== 2006 ===
- 27 November 2006 – F-16CG, serial 90–0776, from the 524th Fighter Squadron crashes near Fallujah while on a low-altitude ground-strafing run. The pilot, Major Troy Gilbert, was killed. His body was taken by insurgents. Partial remains were recovered in 2006 and in September 2012. The final remains were recovered in 2016.

=== 2005 ===
- (2) 2 May 2005 – Two F/A-18C Block 39/40 Hornet fighter jets of VMFA-323, BuNos 164721 and 164732, collide over south-central Iraq, during a sortie from USS Carl Vinson, killing the two pilots.
- 30 January 2005 – A British C-130K Hercules C.1P XV179 is shot down north of Baghdad, killing 9 Royal Air Force crew and one British soldier.

=== 2004 ===
- 29 December 2004 – A U.S. special operations MC-130H Hercules (c/n 382–5054, 16th SOW, 15th SOS) is written off while landing on Q-West airfield near Mosul, Iraq, though no one was hurt. The pilot was unaware a large pit had been dug in the runway.

=== 2003 ===
- 12 June 2003 – F-16CG A United States Air Force F-16C Block 40B Fighting Falcon 88-0424 of 388th FW/421st FS crashes near Baghdad due to fuel starvation. The pilot ejected safely.
- 8 April 2003 – A-10A 78-0691 of 124th Wing/190th FS shot down by Iraqi Roland SAM; pilot survived.
- 7 April 2003 – F-15E 88-1694/SJ of 4th FW/335th FS crashed on a combat bombing mission near Tikrit, Iraq. Both the pilot and weapon systems officer (WSO) were killed.
- 2 April 2003 – F/A-18C Block 46 Hornet 164974 of VFA-195 is shot down by a US Patriot missile, killing the pilot.
- 1 April 2003 – F-14A Tomcat 158620 'NF-104' of VF-154 crashes; the pilots survive.
- 1 April 2003 – AV-8B+(R) Harrier 165391 of HMM-263 crashes off USS Nassau; the pilot was rescued.
- 1 April 2003 – S-3A Viking 160584 of VS-38 crashes off USS Constellation; two pilots survive.
- 23 March 2003 – Tornado GR.4A ZG710 'D' of 13 Squadron is shot down by a US Patriot missile, killing the pilot and navigator, both from 9 Squadron.

== Other aircraft ==
Several civilian and other aircraft have been shot down or crashed in Iraq as well:

=== 2009 ===
- 17 July 2009 – An MD-530F contracted to Xe (formerly Blackwater) crashes at Butler Range outside Baghdad. Two pilots died. The cause was not known.

=== 2008 ===
- (São Tomé and Príncipe) 13 November 2008 – An Antonov An-12 of British Gulf International Airlines crashes after takeoff from Al Asad Air Base, killing all 7 crew members.

=== 2007 ===
- (Georgia (country)) 7 March 2007 – A privately contracted Mil Mi-8 helicopter from Georgia crashes due to technical failures, injuring its three Ukrainian crewmembers, and several Iraqi passengers.
- (United States) 31 January 2007 – A Blackwater USA Bell 412 helicopter is shot down under fire near Karma during a flight between Al Hillah and Baghdad. A US military helicopter rescues the passengers and crew.
- (United States) 23 January 2007 – A Blackwater USA MD 530F helicopter is shot down by hostile fire in Baghdad. All of the 5-man crew are killed in the incident, likely executed after surviving the crash. One survivor was also killed under unclear circumstances, when another Blackwater helicopter descended to the crash site.
- 9 January 2007 – A Moldovan Antonov An-26 crashes near Balad in the 2007 Balad aircraft crash, killing 34 of the 35 on board.

=== 2005 ===
- 30 May – A Comp Air 7SL aircraft with the Iraqi Air Force crashes in eastern Iraq, killing four Americans and an Iraqi on board.
- (Bulgaria) 21 April – A Bulgarian Mil Mi-8 is shot down north of Baghdad, killing the 11 civilians on board. Casualties consisted of six American contractors, three Bulgarian pilots – one of whom was executed shortly after the crash – and two Fijian gunners.

== Summary per type ==
Summing up the above list we have the following tables

Rotary-wing losses

138 (52 to hostile fire including 4 AH-64 Apaches destroyed on the ground by mortar fire)

Aircraft losses
Type	Lost	Hostile fire
OH-58 Kiowa (all variants)	33	10
AH-64 Apache (all variants)	34	15
UH-60 Black Hawk	28	13
MH-60 Seahawk	1	0
AH-1W Super Cobra	8	3
CH-47 Chinook	7	1
Boeing AH-6	1	1
CH-46 Sea Knight	6	2
CH-53E Super Stallion	5	0
SA 330 Puma	4	0
Mil Mi-17	3	1
Mil Mi-24	1	0
MH-53 Pave Low	2	1
SH-3 Sea King	1	0
UH-1N Huey	3	1
Bell-412	1	1
MD530F	2	1
Westland Lynx	2	1
CH-53D Sea Stallion	1	0
Mil Mi-8 Hip	2	1
Hughes OH-6 Cayuse	1	0
PZL W-3 Sokół	2	0

Fixed-wing losses

24 (3 to hostile fire, 2 to friendly fire)

Type	Destroyed	Hostile fire
F/A-18 Hornet	5	1 (Friendly Fire)
F-16 Fighting Falcon	5	
C-130 Hercules	4 (2, 2)	2
A-10 Warthog	1	1
AV-8 Harrier	1	
F-14 Tomcat	1	
F-15E Strike Eagle	1	
S-3 Viking	1	
Tornado GR4	1	1 (Friendly Fire)
C-23 Sherpa	1	
Aerocomp Comp Air 7	1 (Iraq)	
Antonov An-26	1 (Moldova)	
Antonov An-12	1 (São Tomé and Príncipe)	

== Summary per year ==
Summing up the above list we have the following tables:

Year	Total	Hostile fire	Other reason	Human casualties
2010	3	0	3	8
2009	4	1	3	7
2008	7	1	6	18
2007	25	16	9	49
2006	14	6	8	52
2005	13	3	10	45
2004	29	11	18	30
2003	34	7	27	68
Total	129	46	83	277

== See also ==
- List of aviation accidents and incidents in the war in Afghanistan
- List of combat losses of United States military aircraft since the Vietnam War
