= VMM-166 =

Marine Medium Tiltrotor Squadron 166
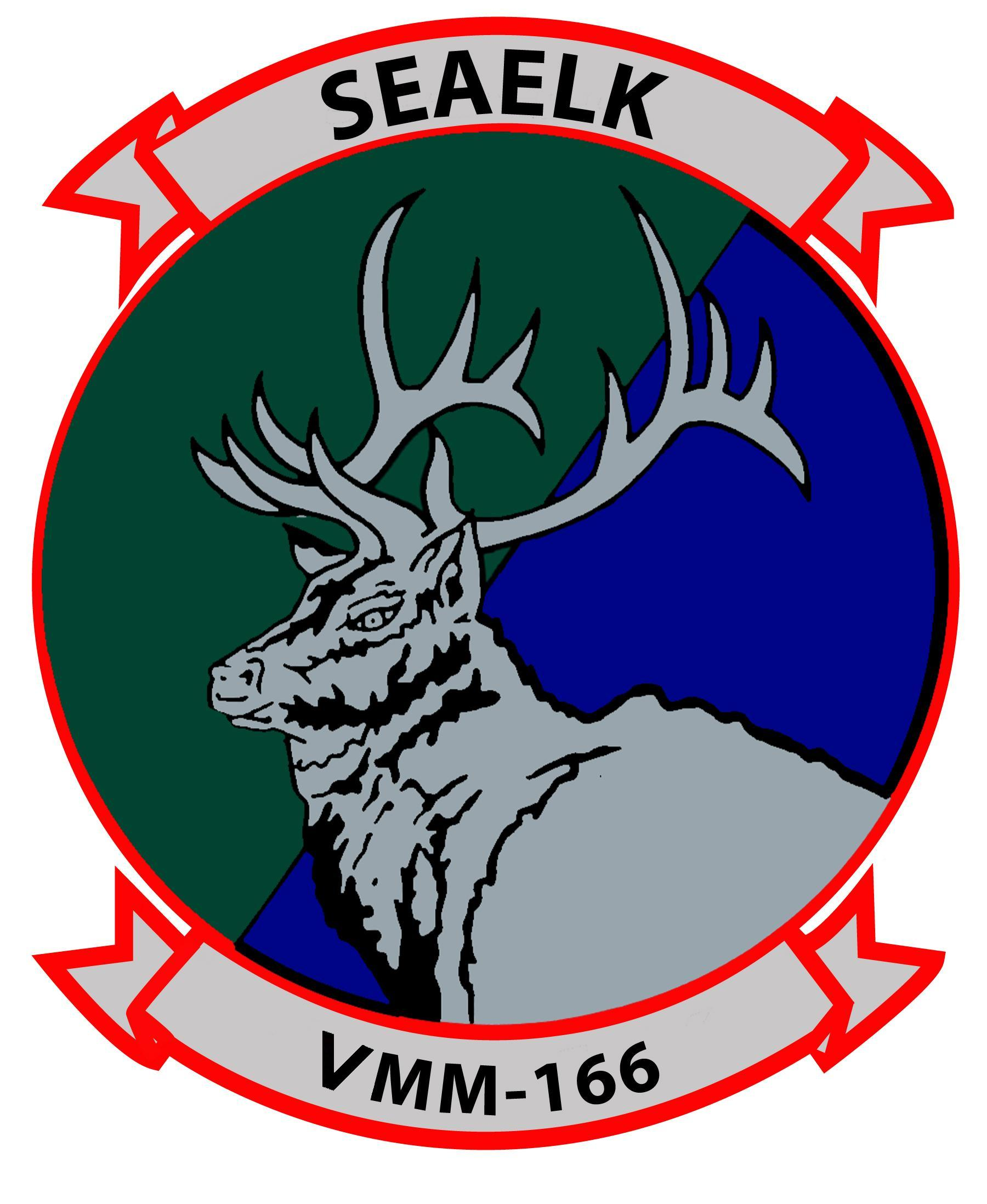
- VMM-166 insignia
- Active: 13 September 1985 – 1 October 2021
- Allegiance: United States of America
- Branch: United States Marine Corps
- Type: Medium-lift helicopter squadron
- Role: Assault support CASEVAC
- Part of: Marine Aircraft Group 16
- Garrison/HQ: Marine Corps Air Station Miramar
- Nickname: Sea Elk
- Motto: "Because We Cann"
- Tail Code: YX
- Mascot: Lucky the Elk
- Engagements: Operation Desert Storm; Operation Restore Hope; Operation Iraqi Freedom; Operation Inherent Resolve

Marine Medium Tiltrotor Squadron 166 (VMM-166) was a United States Marine Corps tiltrotor squadron consisting of MV-22 Osprey transport aircraft. The squadron, known as the "SeaElk", was last based at Marine Corps Air Station Miramar, California. Activated in 1985, HMM-166 was the youngest CH-46 helicopter squadron in the Marine Corps. The squadron was redesignated as a tiltrotor squadron on 23 June 2010. The squadron was deactivated on 1 October 2021.

== History ==
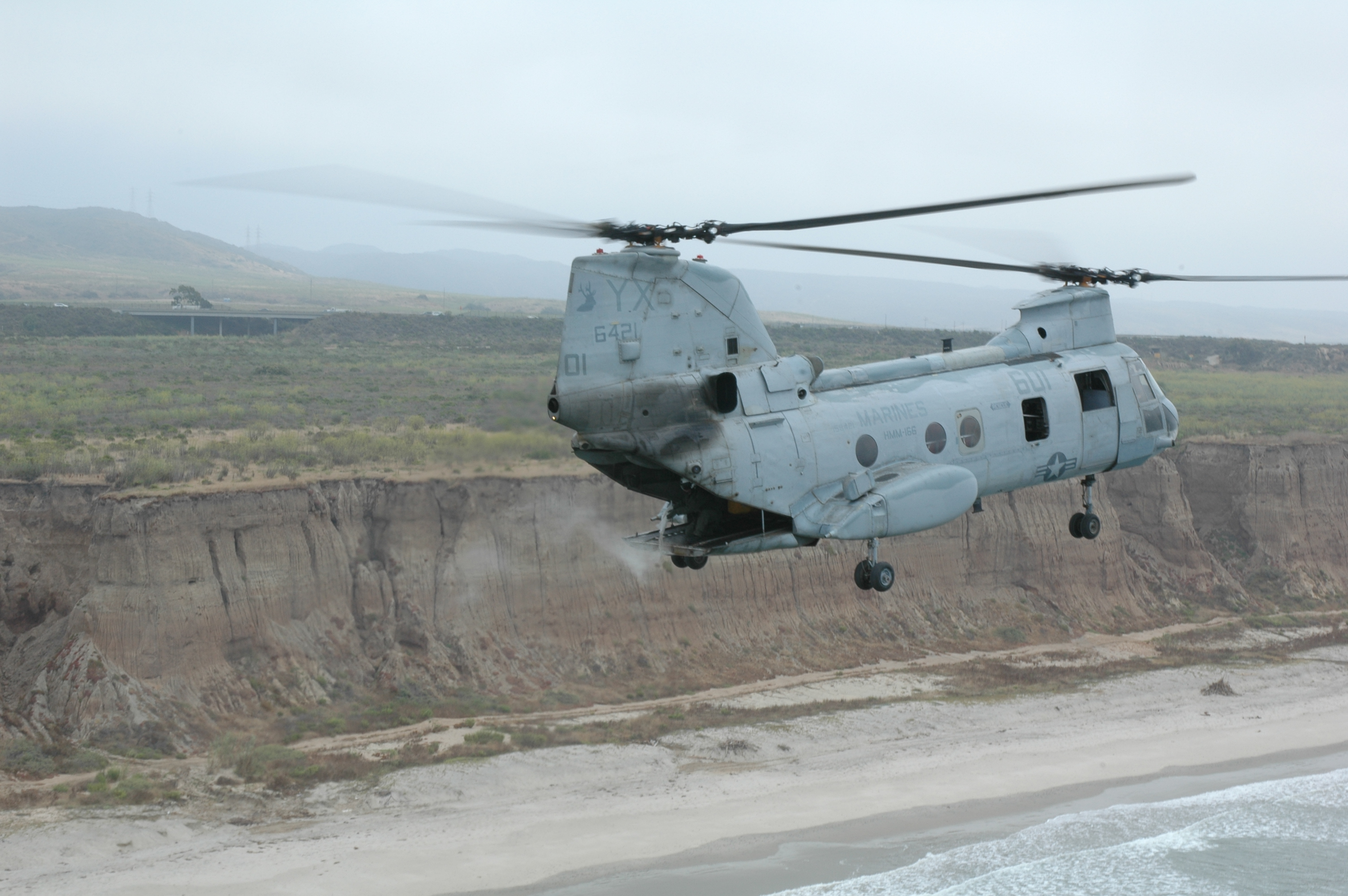
Phrog from HMM-166 spreads the ashes of its former CO over Camp Pendleton in July 2005

The squadron was activated on 13 September 1985 at Marine Corps Air Station Tustin, California and assigned to Marine Aircraft Group 16. They relocated during 1995 to Marine Corps Air Station El Toro, California and again during 1999 to MCAS Miramar, California.

166 has been active in:

- 1990 - Operation Desert Shield
- 1991 - Operation Desert Storm
- 1994 - Operation Support Hope
- 1994 - Operation Restore Hope
- 1998 - Operation Southern Watch
- 2004 - Operation Iraqi Freedom

In 2004, HMM-166 deployed as the aviation combat element of the 11th Marine Expeditionary Unit in support of Operation Iraqi Freedom. During this deployment they participated in the Battle of Najaf.

On 5 November 2007, the squadron deployed to the Western Pacific as the aviation combat element of the 11th Marine Expeditionary Unit. From 4 to 6 December, as part of the 11th MEU, HMM-166 flew 29 humanitarian assistance missions over Bangladesh to transport more than 54,165 pounds of food and supplies and 1875 gallons of water to the people most affected by Tropical Cyclone Sidr.

On 5 May 2009, a SuperCobra belonging to the squadron crashed at 1154 hrs PST into the Cleveland National Forest, California. The crash resulted in the fatalities of the aircraft's two pilots, Jessica Conkling, 27, and Aaron Cox, 26. The SuperCobra had departed Naval Air Facility El Centro 30–40 minutes earlier for Marine Corps Air Station Miramar. The cause of the crash was an improperly secured transmission cover which came off in flight and struck the tail rotor.

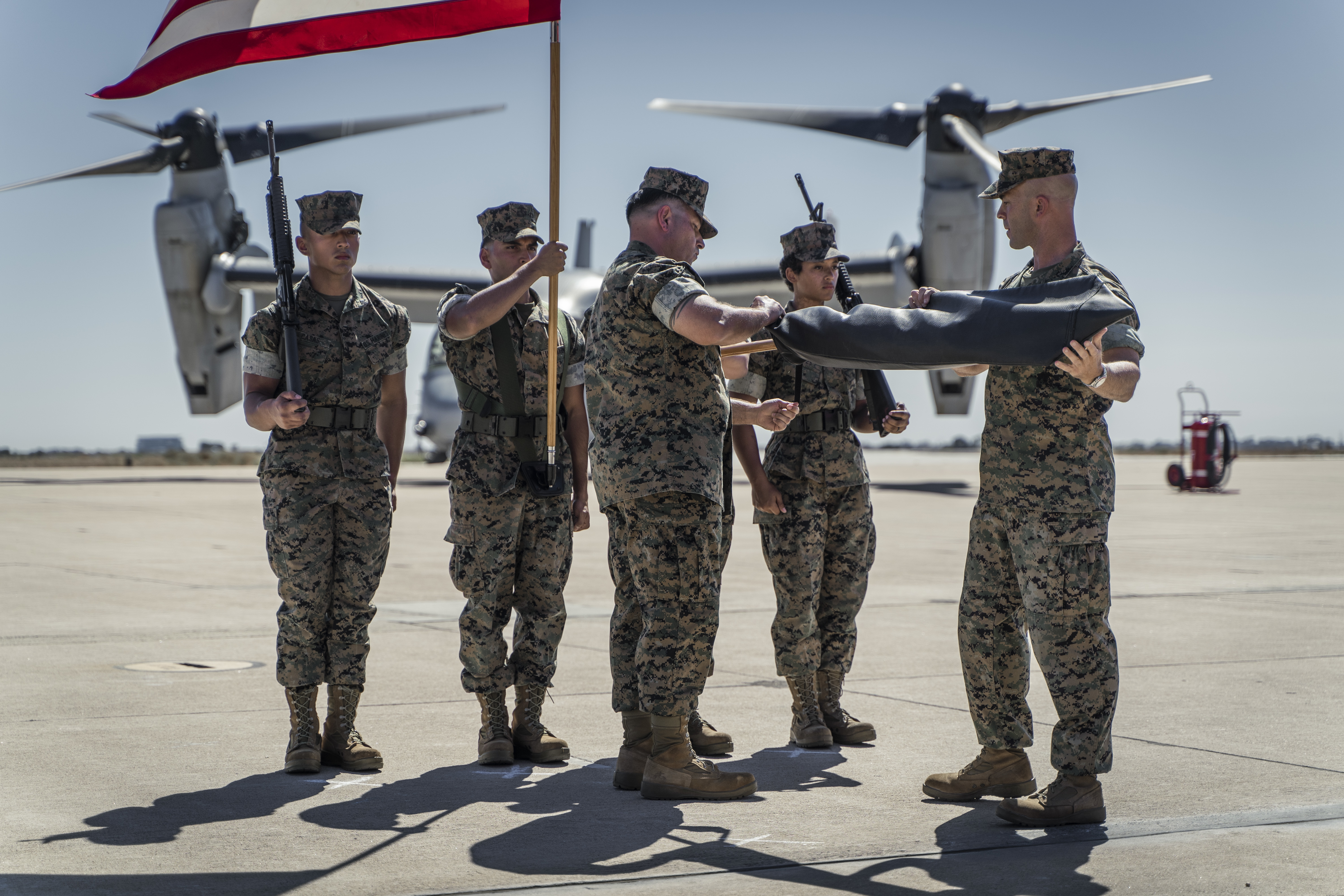
LtCol James Clifford Ford III, Commanding Officer, VMM-166, and SgtMaj Mohammad A. Arzola, Sergeant Major, case the colors for VMM-166 at a decommissioning ceremony on Marine Corps Air Station Miramar, 1 October 2021.

In September 2009, HMM-166(REIN) again deployed as the aviation combat element of the 11th Marine Expeditionary Unit. They participated in exercises in East Timor, Indonesia, United Arab Emirates, Kuwait and Djibouti. They returned from the deployment in April 2010. The squadron was redesignated as VMM-166 on 23 June 2010 as they transitioned to the MV-22 Osprey.

On 1 October 2021, VMM-166 was decommissioned at Marine Corps Air Station Miramar, CA as a result of Marine Corps decisions from Force Design 2030.

== Unit awards ==
A unit citation or commendation is an award bestowed upon an organization for the action cited. Members of the unit who participated in said actions are allowed to wear on their uniforms the awarded unit citation. HMM-166 has been presented with the following awards:

Streamer	Award	Year(s)	Additional Info
	Joint Meritorious Unit Award Streamer	1994	Rwanda-Zaire
	Navy Unit Commendation Streamer with one Bronze Star	1990–1991, 1994	Southwest Asia
	Meritorious Unit Commendation Streamer with one Bronze Star	1987, 2000	
	National Defense Service Streamer with one Bronze Stars	1990–1995, 2001–present	Gulf War, war on terrorism
	Armed Forces Expeditionary Streamer		
	Global War on Terrorism Expeditionary Streamer		2006
	Global War on Terrorism Service Streamer	2001–present	

== See also ==
- United States Marine Corps Aviation
- Organization of the United States Marine Corps
- List of active United States Marine Corps aircraft squadrons
