= 2005 Al-Anbar CH-53E crash =

2005 aviation accident

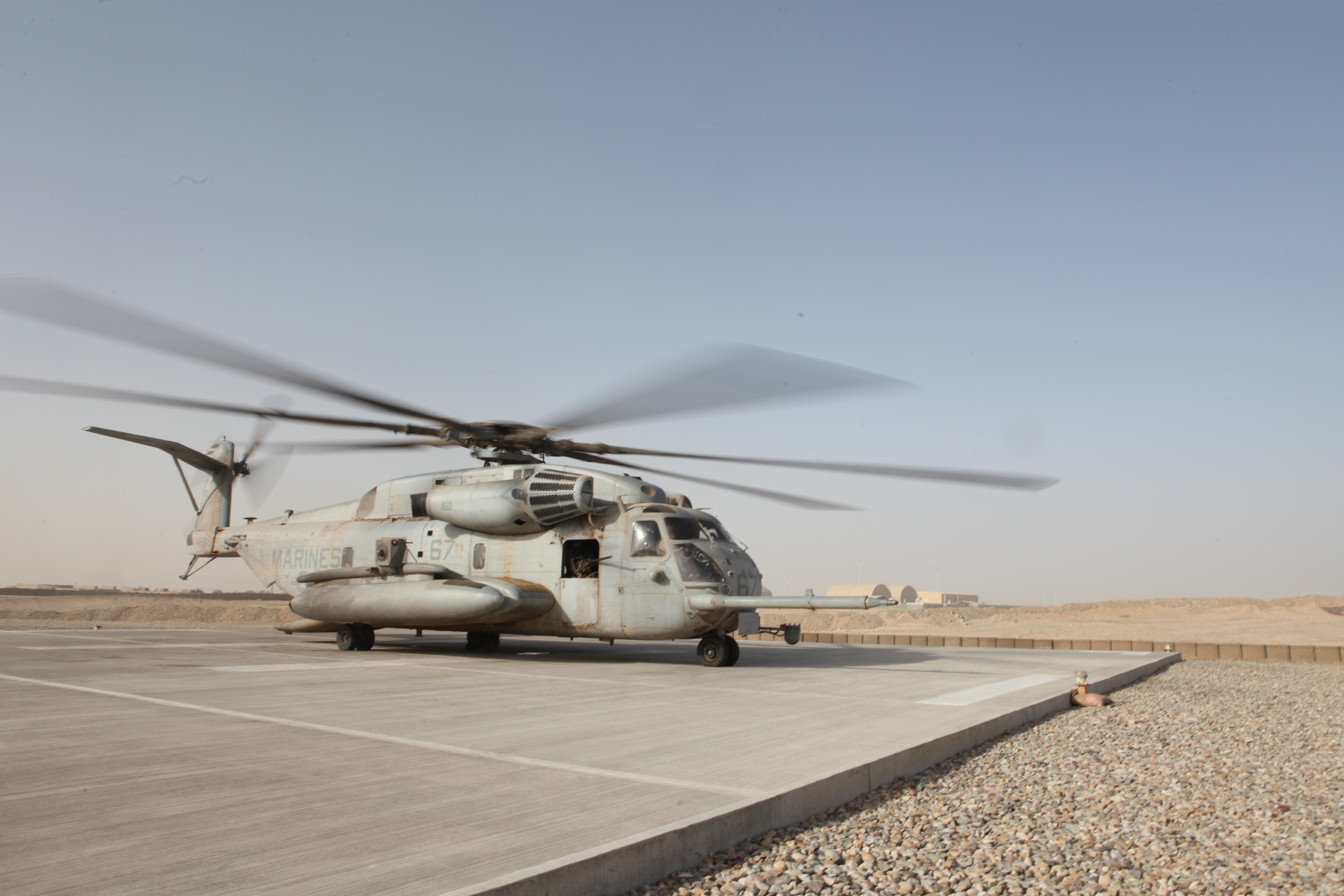
- A CH-53E helicopter, similar to the one that crashed.

Accident
- Date: 26 January 2005
- Summary: Crashed in a sandstorm
- Site: Al-Anbar Province, Iraq

Aircraft
- Aircraft type: CH-53E Super Stallion
- Operator: United States Marine Corps HMH-361
- Registration: 164536
- Flight origin: Al-Taqaddum Air Base
- Destination: H-3 Air Base
- Occupants: 31
- Passengers: 27
- Crew: 4
- Fatalities: 31
- Survivors: 0

The 2005 Al-Anbar CH-53E crash refers to an aviation accident which occurred on January 26, 2005 when a United States Marine Corps CH-53E Super Stallion helicopter crashed while ferrying U.S. military personnel in the Al-Anbar province of western Iraq, near the town of Ar-Rutbah. All thirty-one troops aboard the helicopter died in the crash, which made it the deadliest single incident for U.S. troops during the Iraq War. The accident took place while coalition forces were trying to secure the country ahead of the January 2005 Iraqi parliamentary election slated to take place later that month. The cause of the crash was determined to be the pilots becoming disoriented when they flew into a sandstorm.

== Background ==
The CH-53E Super Stallion first entered service in 1981, becoming the largest and heaviest helicopter in the inventory of the United States military. Its three gas turbine engines gave the helicopter a superior amount of thrust capability and allowed it to become the workhorse of the U.S. Marine Corps, its primary operator.

U.S. forces in Iraq were also at the time facing increasing opposition to its previously unchallenged air superiority. Insurgent forces were increasingly targeting coalition aircraft, usually American helicopters, which provided ample targets. In November 2003, a CH-47 Chinook helicopter was shot down near Fallujah by a shoulder-fired missile, killing 16 American troops. In 2004, a total of 13 U.S. helicopters were brought down by enemy ground fire over Iraq. The increasing prevalence of ground fire led American forces to change their tactics, and helicopters began flying low and predominantly at night to avoid drawing fire.

Another threat to U.S. helicopters in Iraq was sand. The arid desert environment led many U.S. aircraft to become contaminated with large quantities of sand, affecting aircraft performance and overall mechanical well-being as well as posing a threat to pilots, who can be blinded during landing operations. At an October 2003 hearing of the House Armed Services Committee, Representative Joel Hefley (R-CO), the chairman, said the typical Super Stallion returning from service in Afghanistan and Iraq was found to have 150 pounds of sand spread throughout its interior.

== Accident ==
At 1:20 am AST on 26 January 2005 a CH-53E Super Stallion helicopter (164536), code named Sampson 22 from Marine Heavy Helicopter Squadron 361 (HMH-361) was ferrying a platoon of U.S. Marines from the 3rd Marine Division in Al-Anbar province, Iraq near the town of Ar-Rutbah, about seventy miles from the Jordanian border when it encountered a sandstorm.

Al-Anbar province, Iraq

Sampson 22's pilots, Captain Paul C. Alaniz, 32, and Captain Lyle L. Gordon, 31, became disoriented in the storm and did not realize the helicopter was banking to the left when it crashed into the ground. All of the four crew and 27 passengers, of which all but one were U.S. Marines, were killed. General John Abizaid, commander of US troops in Iraq, said the helicopter was on "a routine mission in support of the elections". The helicopter was carrying the troops to secure a polling site in preparation for the January 2005 Iraqi parliamentary elections set to take place four days from the day of the crash.

== Aftermath ==
At 10:00 a.m the same day of the crash, the Marines confirmed the loss of all thirty-one aboard the helicopter. The helicopter crash was the deadliest loss of American troops in a single incident of the entire Iraq War, and as a result January 26, 2005, became the deadliest day for U.S. troops during the war, since six more American troops were killed throughout the country on that day.

Captain Norman T. Day, the mishap CH-53E's wingman, was relieved of flying duty as a result of the crash and faced the threat of charges of dereliction of duty after it was revealed that he was responsible for providing updated weather information for the flight. A heavily redacted 400-page report cited causes such as spatial disorientation, overconfidence in the use of night-vision goggles, and pilot error in addition to the poor weather conditions.

In a statement on January 26, President George W. Bush paid condolences to the men killed in the crash in a larger statement about the Iraqi elections stating "The story today is going to be very discouraging to the American people," Bush said at the White House. "I understand that. We value life. And we weep and mourn when soldiers lose their life. And—but it is the long-term objective that is vital, and that is to spread freedom. Otherwise, the Middle East will be—will continue to be a cauldron of resentment and hate, a recruiting ground for those who have this vision of the world that is the exact opposite of ours" and "Anytime we lose lives, it is a sad moment."
