= HMH-465 =

Marine Heavy Helicopter Squadron 465
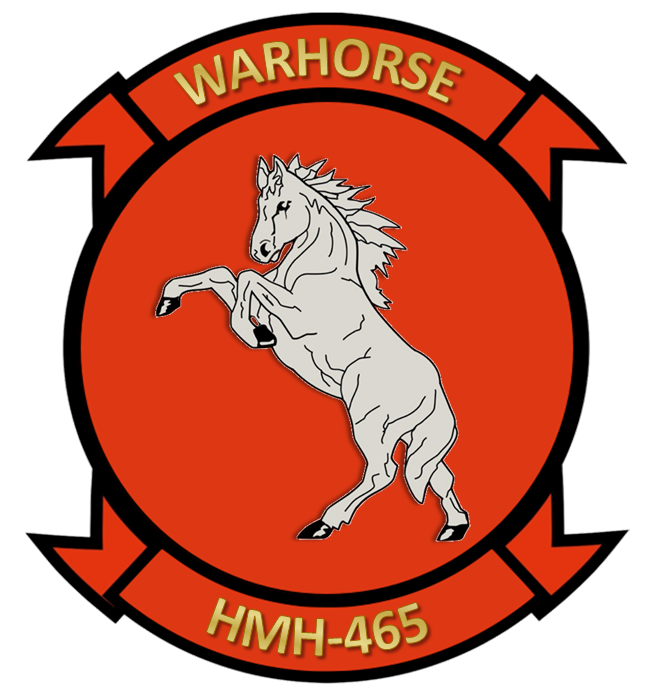
- HMH-465 Squadron Insignia
- Active: 1 December 1981 - present
- Country: United States of America
- Allegiance: United States of America
- Branch: United States Marine Corps
- Type: Marine Corps Heavy Lift Helicopter Squadron
- Role: Assault support
- Part of: Marine Aircraft Group 16; 3rd Marine Aircraft Wing
- Garrison/HQ: Marine Corps Air Station Miramar
- Nickname: Warhorse
- Motto: "Take the Reins"
- Tail Code: YJ
- Engagements: Operation Desert Storm; Operation Enduring Freedom; Operation Iraqi Freedom * 2003 invasion of Iraq

Commanders
- Commanding Officer: LtCol M.L. "Donkey" Drozd

Marine Heavy Helicopter Squadron 465 (HMH-465) is a United States Marine Corps helicopter squadron consisting of CH-53E Super Stallion transport helicopters. The squadron, known as "Warhorse", is based at Marine Corps Air Station Miramar in California and falls under the command of Marine Aircraft Group 16 (MAG-16) and the 3rd Marine Aircraft Wing (3rd MAW).

== History ==
=== Early years ===
Marine Heavy Helicopter Squadron 465, the "Warhorse", was established on 1 December 1981 as the first West Coast squadron to fly the CH-53E Super Stallion. It became the Marine Corps' second and Marine Aircraft Group 16's first CH-53E Squadron.

The "Warhorses" deployed and flew in combat for the first time during Operation Desert Shield and Operation Desert Storm. On 1 September 1990 the squadron arrived at Jubail, Saudi Arabia, in support of all joint forces in theater. During this deployment, the squadron lost two aircraft leaving the unit with six helicopters for the remainder of the war. The squadron provided heavy lift support for I MEF throughout the entire conflict. HMH-465 finally returned to Marine Corps Air Station Tustin on 15 March 1991.

=== 1990s ===
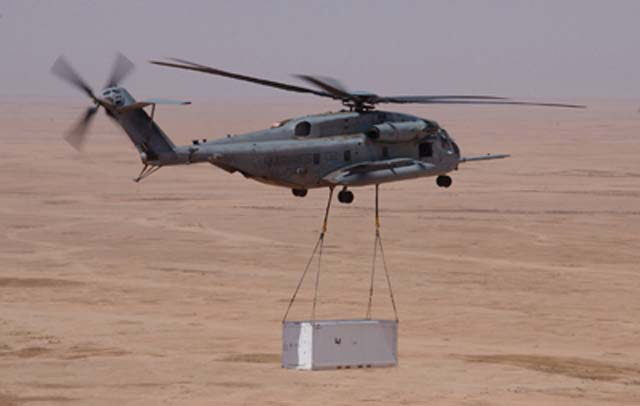
HMH-465 CH-53E doing an external lift in Iraq

Another challenge for HMH-465 came on 5 October 1991 when LtCol Russell L. Llewellyn III, Commanding Officer, deployed twelve CH-53E's and all squadron assets and personnel on five C-5's and two C-141's to Marine Corps Air Station Futenma in Okinawa, Japan, for a seven-month Unit Deployment as the first CH-53E Squadron to Okinawa Japan. The squadron supported numerous exercises in this period throughout the Asian theater.

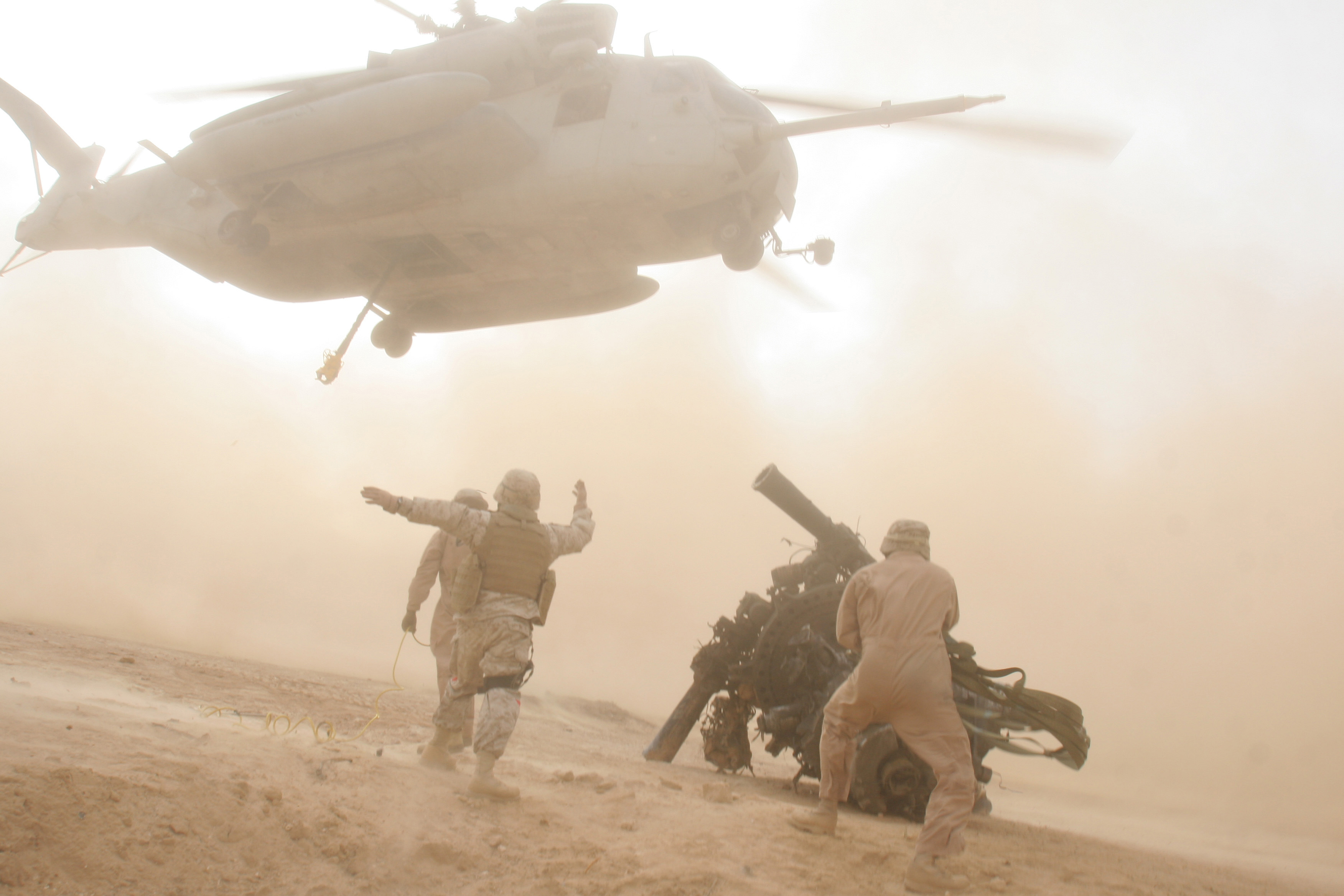
A CH-53E from HMH-465 picking up a load of rotor blades from a downed chopper on 25 December 2006.

On 13 January 1995 two squadron aircraft assisted in the recovery of four Navy aircrew members who ejected when their F-14Ds collided. For this action 11 squadron members were awarded Sikorsky Aircraft Rescue Awards.

In January 1998 HMH-465 achieved 20,000 mishap free flight hours.

From December 1999 to July 2000 the "Warhorse" squadron spent seven months deployed to Okinawa, Japan as part of the Unit Deployment Program. They redeployed to Okinawa in March 2001.

=== Global War on Terror ===
Elements of HMH-465 attached to the 15th MEU in 2001 participated in the initial invasion of Afghanistan from October 2001 to December 2001. The Warhorse inserted elements of the MEU to seize what would become FOB Rhino and were key to establishing a footprint for follow-on forces in the initial days and weeks of Operation Enduring Freedom. The Warhorses have deployed numerous times in support of Operation Iraqi Freedom. On the night of 1 April 2003, the squadron comprised the CH-53E element of Task Force 20, the special team that extracted prisoner of war Army PFC Jessica Lynch. Their latest tour began in October 2006, where they are based out of Al Asad and providing assault support to Marines in the Al Anbar Province of Iraq. On 11 December 2006, a helicopter from HMH-465 carrying 21 personnel crashed while landing, killing 1 and injuring 17.

In the spring of 2007, HMH-465 has supplied detachments for the 15th and 31st Marine Expeditionary Units. Through these detachments the Squadron has continued to support the Global War on Terror throughout Southeast Asia and provide vital disaster relief.

The Warhorses deployed three aircraft and 40 Marines to Naval Air Station Lemoore on 2 July 2008 after California Governor Arnold Schwarzenegger requested military assistance to fight raging wildfires. The helicopters provided heavy lift rotary wing support to United States Northern Command and the National Fire Center. After nearly two weeks, where they dropped more than 68,000 gallons of water on the Basin Complex Fire in Big Sur, the squadron's detachment of three helicopters and 30+ Marines was moved to McClellan Airfield near Sacramento to aid fire fighters with a 7,000-acre (28 km^{2}) wildfire burning in Mendocino County.

Supporting the Global War on Terror continued to be a priority for the Warhorse as they conducted training detachments across eight states in preparation for OIF and OEF deployments, up until the squadron's final combat deployment from in January 2011 as part of a composite HMH-East and HMH-West OEF deployment.

=== Transitional Years (2009–2015) ===
From 2009 to 2015, the Marines of HMH-465 were the primary squadron tasked with supporting MEU's as the 3d MAW began transitioning from OIF to OEF. This entailed multiple 31st MEU deployments, 3 SoCal MEU deployments, before they returned to executing a Unit Deployment Program deployment from November 2014 until May 2015. The 15th MEU detachment, as part of VMM-161 (REIN) conducted operational testing of Digital Interoperability equipment which led to refinement of the MAGTAB hardware and software package.

=== Recent History (2015–Present) ===
In 2015, the CH-53E fleet was red-striped for a series of mechanical and electrical inspections as a result of a MH-53 crash off the coast of Norfolk, Virginia. The squadron's 15th MEU Detachment, which at the time was instrumental in leading the OT&E for Digitial Interoperability was the first operational element of CH-53E's to return to flight status. The 15th MEU's detachment successfully inspected and repaired all 4 aircraft within a period of 5 weeks, working non-stop during MEU work-ups to ensure the detachment fulfilled heavy lift requirements during that float.

On April 3, 2018, the squadron suffered from a MISHAP in vicinity of NAF El Centro, CA when the crew of "Warhorse 41" experienced a mechanical malfunction that resulted in the loss of all 4 crew members and the aircraft during a day training flight. The 4 crew members that perished that day were Capt Samuel Schultz (HAC), Capt Samuel Philips (Copilot), GySgt Derik Holley (Crew Chief), and LCpl Taylor Conrad (Crew Chief). In honor of the crew, Warhorse retired the callsign "41" and no longer uses any series of 40 for the operational callsigns. Additionally, the squadron has remembered the crew ever year since the MISHAP with a memorial event and has a wall dedicated to their memory in the Squadron.

During the 2019 Tri-Site Deployment, elements of the UDP19-1 detachment transported a downed AH-1Z from an island off the coast of Okinawa and returned it back to mainland for repairs. Additionally during this deployment, the squadron successfully conducted ADGR operations with USMC F-35B aircraft on Ie Shima Island, Okinawa, Japan; another operational first for the Marine Corps.

== See also ==
- United States Marine Corps Aviation
- Organization of the United States Marine Corps
- List of United States Marine Corps aircraft squadrons
