= Marine Aircraft Group 16 =

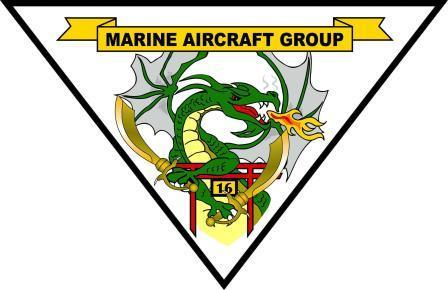
- MAG-16's insignia
- Active: 1 March 1952 – present
- Country: United States
- Branch: United States Marine Corps
- Type: Helicopter group
- Role: Assault support
- Part of: 3rd Marine Aircraft Wing; I Marine Expeditionary Force
- Garrison/HQ: Marine Corps Air Station Miramar
- Engagements: Vietnam War; Operation Starlite; Operation Desert Storm; Global war on terrorism; Operation Enduring Freedom; Operation Iraqi Freedom; 2003 Invasion of Iraq; Operation Vigilant Resolve; Operation Phantom Fury

Commanders
- Current commander: Col. Nathan J. Storm

Marine Aircraft Group 16 is a United States Marine Corps aviation unit based at Marine Corps Air Station Miramar that is currently composed of four V-22 Osprey squadrons, four CH-53 Super Stallion squadrons, one Personnel Support Detachment, and an aviation logistics squadron. The group falls under the command of the 3rd Marine Aircraft Wing and the I Marine Expeditionary Force.

== Mission ==
Provide air support to Marine Air-Ground Task Force commanders.

== Organization 2024 ==
As of March 2024 the Marine Aircraft Group 16 consists of:

CH-53E Super Stallion squadrons:

- HMH-361 "Flying Tigers"
- HMH-462 "Heavy Haulers"
- HMH-465 "Warhorse"
- HMH-466 "Wolfpack"

MV-22 Osprey squadrons:

- VMM-161 "Greyhawks"
- VMM-163 "Evil Eyes" (Formerly "Ridge Runners")
- VMM-165 "White Knights"
- VMM-362 "Ugly Angels"

Support squadron:

- Marine Aviation Logistics Squadron 16 (MALS-16) Immortals (Formerly "Forerunners")

== History ==
Marine Helicopter Transport Group 16 (MAG(HR)-16) was commissioned on 1 March 1952 at Marine Corps Air Facility Santa Ana, California. MAG-16 was the first helicopter group established in the Marine Corps. Prior to its activation helicopter squadrons were considered special units and reported directly to the Air Wing commanding general with no intermediate command. Colonel Harold J. Mitchener was MAG-16's first commanding officer. Seven units made up the newly formed MAG: Headquarters Squadron (HQSQ) 16, Marine Airbase Squadron (MABS) 16, Marine Aircraft Maintenance Squadron (MAMS) 16, Marine Helicopter Transport Squadrons (HMR) 162, 163, 362 and 363.

The group was then based Marine Corps Air Station Futenma on Okinawa.

=== Vietnam War ===
On 15 April 1962 group squadron HMM-362 became the first Marine aircraft unit to serve in South Vietnam when its Sikorsky UH-34s went ashore from the USS Princeton landing at Sóc Trăng Airfield in the Mekong Delta to become the first Operation Shufly squadron. MAG-16 squadrons rotated into and out of South Vietnam on approximately four month intervals, with HMM-163 replacing HMM-362 at Sóc Trăng on 1 August.

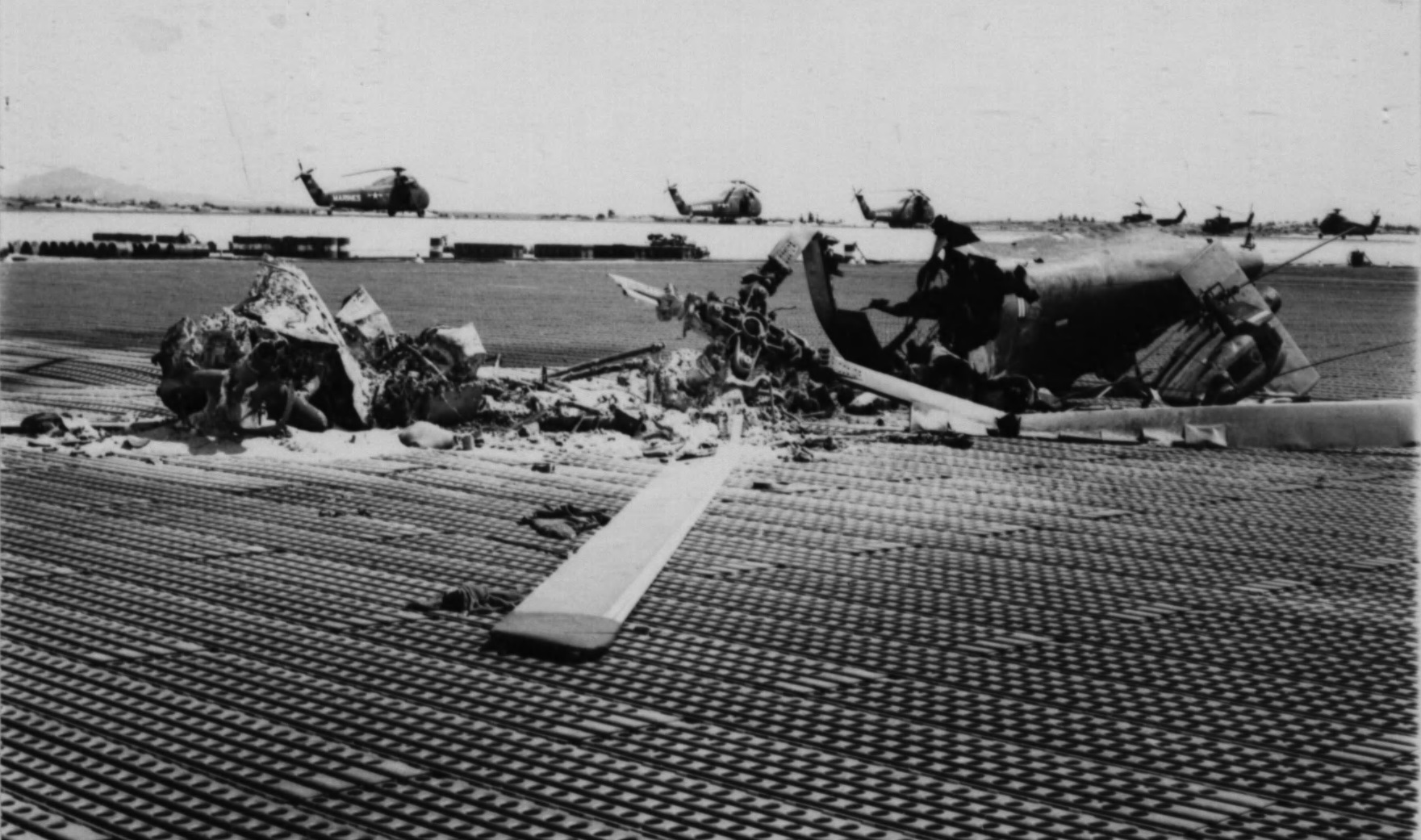
MAG-16 UH-34 destroyed in the attack on MMAF, 28 October 1965

On 8 March 1965 with the landing of the 9th Marine Expeditionary Brigade (9th MEB) at Da Nang the group was assigned to support it. The Marine helicopters continued to operate much the same as they did when under Shufly. Most of their missions were flown in support of the Army of the Republic of Vietnam (ARVN) forces throughout I Corps. Initially, after the landing of the 9th MEB, most of these flights were made by HMM-163. The newly arrived HMM-162 became operational on 12 March, but at first was confined to support of the 9th MEB. By the end of March, both squadrons were supporting the Marines and the ARVN. In late April VMCJ-1 arrived at Da Nang and was assigned to the group. On 13 June HMM-161 came ashore at Phu Bai Combat Base and was assigned to the group. On 14 July the group's fixed wing squadrons were transferred to Marine Aircraft Group 11. In August group squadrons supported Operation Starlite. On the evening of 12–13 August helicopters from MAG-16 participated in the first night helicopter assault of the war, debarking 245 Marines and returning to Da Nang without incident. With Da Nang Air Base becoming increasingly crowded it was decided to relocate MAG-16's helicopter squadrons to a new base and on 26 August they moved into Marble Mountain Air Facility (MMAF) on the Tien Sha Peninsula, 5 miles (8.0 km) southeast of Da Nang. By the end of August the group comprised HMM-261 and HMM-361 at MMAF and HMM-161 at Phu Bai with a 10-plane detachment at Qui Nhon, VMO-2 and two support squadrons, MABS-16 and H&MS-16. In September a six-plane detachment of CH-37C Mojave heavy-lift helicopters from HMH-462 was attached to H&MS-16. On the night of 27/8 October Viet Cong (VC) sappers attacked MMAF destroying 19 helicopters and damaging a further 35. Seventeen VC were killed in the attack and four captured; three Americans were killed and 91 wounded. In November group squadrons supported Operation Harvest Moon.

In January 1966, the 9th Marines and MAG-16 devised a tactical arrangement termed Sparrow Hawk for which each battalion of the regiment maintained a squad-sized force at a special landing zone as a reaction force. When the decision to commit this force was made, UH-34Ds and UH-1E gunships on strip alert at MMAF flew to the LZ, picked up the squad, and transported it to the area of contact. In early March group squadrons flew in support of the Battle of A Sau, eventually evacuating the Special Forces Camp there on 10 March. In early April during the Buddhist Uprising group helicopters evacuated U.S. civilians from Da Nang. In mid-April the group supported Operation Georgia and established a base at An Hoa Combat Base. In early June the group supported Operation Florida. From late June to early July the group supported Operation Jay. From 4 July the group supported Operation Macon. From mid-July the group supported Operation Hastings flying nearly 10,000 sorties. From early August group detachments at Dong Ha Combat Base supported Operation Prairie. At the same time the group supported Operation Colorado.

On 8 January 1967 a four-plane detachment of CH-53A Sea Stallions from HMH-463 joined the group at MMAF. They were the first increment of a phased replacement of the obsolescent CH-37s. On 4 October with the transfer of Marine Aircraft Group 36 (MAG-36) north from Kỳ Hà to Phu Bai the group squadrons at Phu Bai, VMO-3, HMM-164, HMM-362 and MATCU-62 and MACTU-68 were transferred to MAG-36 while HMM-265 at MMAF was transferred to the group. From 28 December group squadrons supported Operation Auburn.

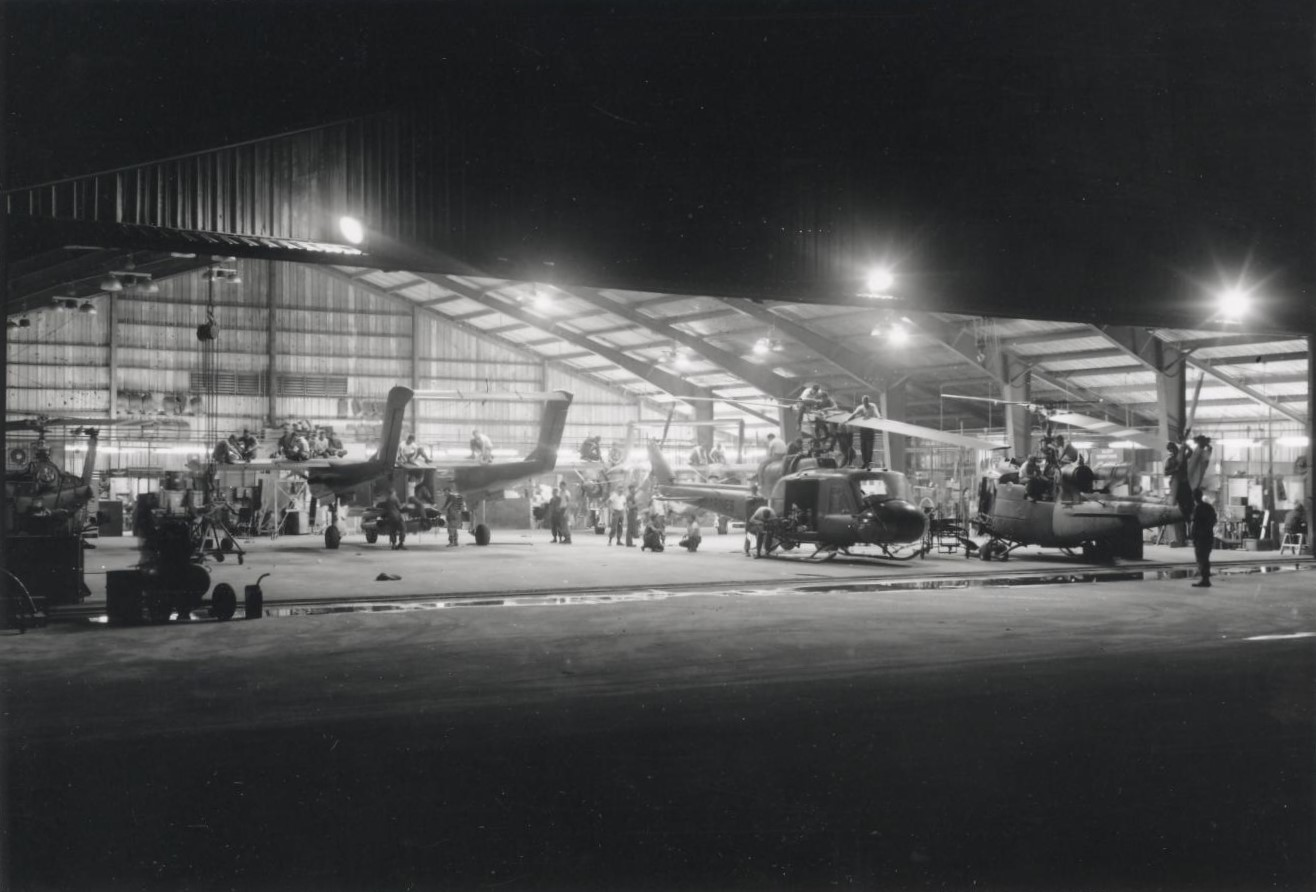
Night maintenance at MMAF, late 1968

At the beginning of 1968 the group comprised H&MS-16, MABS-16, VMO-2, HMM-262, HMM-265, HMM-363 and HMH-463. H&MS-16 had a detachment of 14 O-1C/G Bird Dog air control and observation aircraft and one C-117D Skytrain transport. The group also had operational control of the U.S. Army's 245th Surveillance Aircraft Company, equipped with 18 OV-1 Mohawk aircraft designed for tactical aerial reconnaissance. The group generally supported the 1st Marine Division, but also flew missions on behalf of the 3rd Marine Division, South Korean 2nd Marine Brigade and U.S. Army 23rd Infantry Division. It also performed a myriad of tasks for the South Vietnamese military units and the related Revolutionary Development pacification campaign. On 10 February HMM-361 was transferred to the group and HMM-363 was transferred to Special Landing Force (SLF) Alpha. On 16 June HMM-265 was transferred to SLF Bravo. On 6 September HMM-362 was transferred from SLF Alpha to the group. On 30 September HMM-265 was transferred to MAG-36. From late October the group supported Operation Henderson Hill. On 7 December HMM-362 returned to SLF Alpha. On 10 December HMM-364 was transferred to the group.

At the beginning of 1969 the group comprised HMM-164, HMM-165, HMM-364, HMH-463 and VMO-2 with UH-1Es and OV-10A Broncos. In August HMH-361 equipped with CH-53s joined the group and HMH-462 left the group with the redeployment of MAG-36 in November. On 16 October HML-167 equipped with UH-1E gunships, HMM-161 and HMM-262 joined the group from MAG-36.

At the beginning of 1970 the group comprised HML-167, HML-367 equipped with AH-1G Cobras, HMM-263, HMM-364, HMH-361, HMH-463 and VMO-2 at MMAF and HMM-161 and HMM-262 at Phu Bai which were transferred to the group following the redeployment of MAG-36. In April 1970 the group began using a night helicopter patrol, codenamed Night Hawk, consisting of a CH-46D equipped with a night observation device and two .50-caliber machine guns and accompanied by two AH-1Gs, the Night Hawk patrolled the Da Nang Tactical area of responsibility during the hours of darkness hunting targets of opportunity. In mid-June group helicopters evacuated survivors of the Thanh My massacre. From mid-July the group supported Operation Pickens Forest. By September 1970 with the ongoing withdrawal of Marine units under Operation Keystone Robin Alpha the group comprised HML-167, HML-367, HMM-262, HMM-263, HMM-364 and HMH-463. From 1 September the group supported Operation Imperial Lake. In October the group supported flood relief operations after four tropical storms hit Quảng Nam Province.

In April 1971 the group supported Operation Scott Orchard. In mid-April with the departure of the III Marine Amphibious Force from South Vietnam the remaining Marine units, including MAG-16, were formed into the 3rd Marine Amphibious Brigade. On 1 May HMM-263 was stood down for redeployment. Throughout May group helicopters were removed from service and transported to Da Nang Port for shipment. On 21 June 1971 the group was deactivated.

=== 1980s & 1990s ===
Units of MAG-16 have participated in Operation Desert Punch, Operation Seahorse Wind, Operations Desert Shield/Desert Storm and many other missions, including Operation Iraqi Freedom.

MAG-16 has provided support in Somalia to include rescue operations in many other locations. MAG-16 deploys its units aboard the fleet of the United States Navy to maintain a high state of awareness overseas and abroad. MAG-16 and its units have provided aircraft support and transportation for visiting U.S. dignitaries and celebrities from the President of the United States, Secretary of Defense, Secretary of the Navy, Commandant of the Marine Corps and movie legend Audrey Hepburn. MAG-16 also provides aircraft and personnel for the MCAS Miramar Air Show.

=== Global war on terror ===
From 11 September 2001 through to the present, elements of MAG-16 have actively participated in the Global War on Terror, beginning with HMM-163(REIN)'s role in establish FOB Rhino in Afghanistan as part of the 15th Marine Expeditionary Unit, which consisted of a core CH-46E HMM squadron, a CH-53E detachment from HMH-465, both part of MAG-16, as well as HMLA and VMA detachments. All flying squadrons of MAG-16 have participated in the GWOT in Iraq, Afghanistan, and other locations, but were almost always under the command of other headquarters elements. MAG-16's headquarters element was specifically deployed in support of the GWOT from January 2008 through January 2009, where they provided the primary command of Marine aviation support in Iraq's Al Anbar Province. By the end of this deployment in support of Operation Iraqi Freedom the MAG had achieved a milestone 80,000 flight hours in support of Multi-National Forces West and adjacent commands.

=== Expeditionary transformation ===
MAG-16 continues to reshape its identity for the current expeditionary environment of the Marine Corps. The MV-22B Osprey has replaced the CH-46E Sea Knight and adds a long-range capability to the MAGTF. MAG-16 will continue to refine its identity to "respond to today's crisis with today's force."

== Notable former members ==
- Raymond M. Clausen, Jr. - Medal of Honor recipient
- Eugene R. Brady - MAG-16 commander, Navy Cross recipient
- Robert P. Keller - Lieutenant general; served as Executive officer of the Group in 1958-1959
- Kenneth L. Reusser - Former MAG-16 commander and highly decorated three-war Marine Corps aviator, double Navy Cross and double Distinguished Flying Cross recipient.

== See also ==
- United States Marine Corps Aviation
- List of United States Marine Corps aircraft groups
- List of active United States Marine Corps aircraft squadrons
