= HMH-361 =

Marine Heavy Helicopter Squadron 361
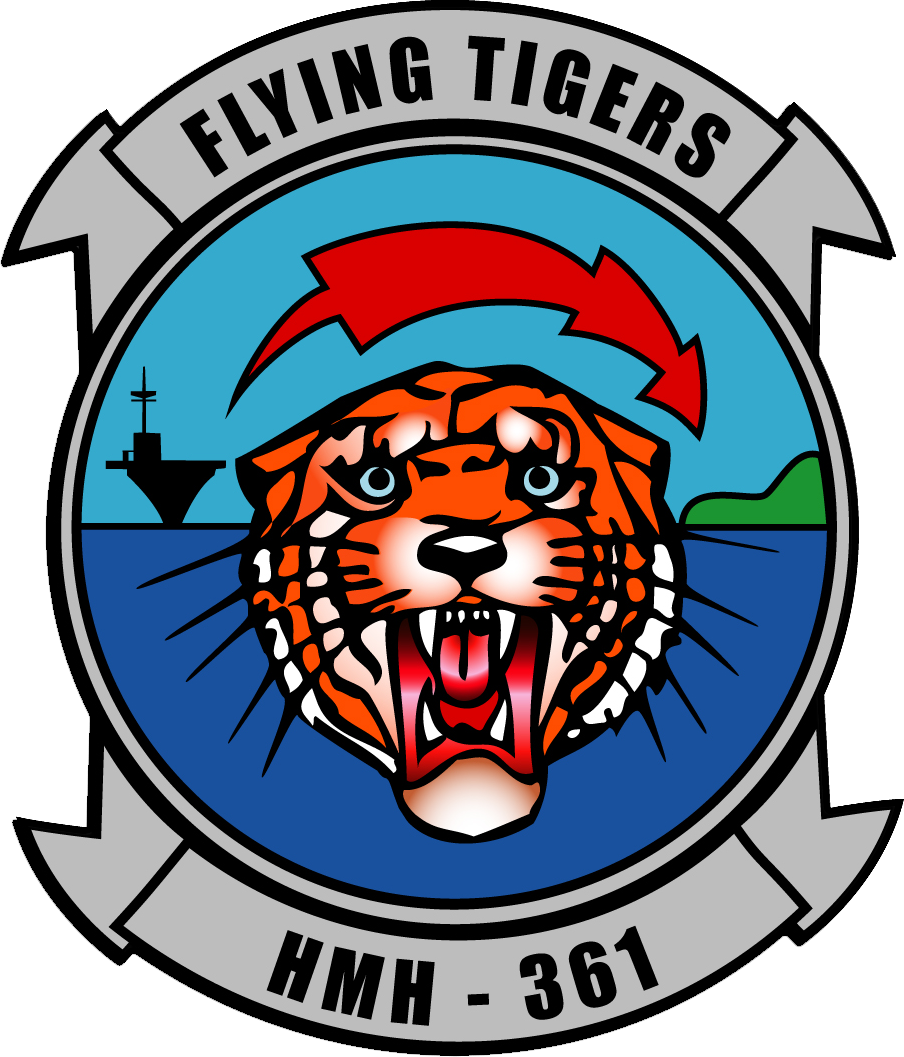
- HMH-361 insignia
- Founded: 25 February 1952
- Country: United States
- Branch: United States Marine Corps
- Type: Marine Heavy Helicopter Squadron
- Role: Assault Support
- Part of: Marine Aircraft Group 16; 3rd Marine Aircraft Wing
- Garrison/HQ: Marine Corps Air Station Miramar
- Nickname: "Flying Tigers"
- Tail Code: YN
- Engagements: Vietnam War; Global war on terrorism; Operation Enduring Freedom; Operation Iraqi Freedom

Commanders
- Current commander: LtCol Kyleigh Cullen

Marine Heavy Helicopter Squadron 361 (HMH-361) is a United States Marine Corps helicopter squadron consisting of CH-53E Super Stallion transport helicopters. The squadron, known as the "Flying Tigers", is based at Marine Corps Air Station Miramar in California, and falls under the command of Marine Aircraft Group 16 (MAG-16) and the 3rd Marine Aircraft Wing (3rd MAW).

== History ==
=== Early years ===
HMH-361 was initially commissioned as Marine Transport Squadron 361 on 25 February 1952 at what was then Marine Corps Air Station Santa Ana. The squadron was attached to the only helicopter group in the Marine Corps, Marine Air Group (HR) 16. At that time, the squadron consisted of only three OY-2 and one HRS-2 helicopters located at Marine Corps Air Station El Toro. The original mission of the squadron was to train for and improve upon amphibious ship-to-shore tactics. An additional mission was training replacement pilots for duty in the Korean War.

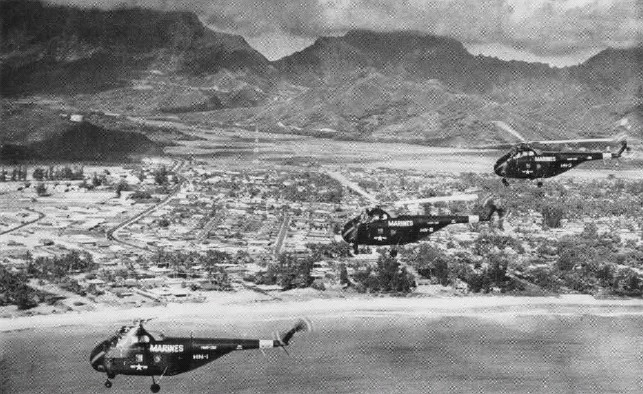
HMR-361 HRS helicopters over Kaneohe Bay, Oahu, Hawaii, 1953

Shortly thereafter the squadron undertook its first major operation, to provide support for the atomic test exercise at Desert Rock, Nevada, which is still the largest helicopter operation in history. Upon their return, HMR-361 was transferred to the newly established MAG (HR)-36 at MCAF Santa Ana in 1953. On 31 December 1956, the squadron was redesignated HMR(l)-361 and was now flying the HRS-3 helicopter. The squadron participated in two more atomic bomb testing exercises, beginning in June 1957 and February 1958.

In September 1958, the squadron began flying the H-34 helicopter and in 1960 performed the first West Coast parachute drop for Marine Pathfinders from the H-34. On February 1, 1962, the squadron was redesignated HMM-361 according to a Marine Corps wide redesignation for all H-34 squadrons. HMM-361 deployed for the Cuban Missile Crisis on 27 October 1962, in support of the 5th Marine Expeditionary Force onboard the USS Iwo Jima.

=== Vietnam War ===
In June 1963, the squadron was deployed to Okinawa. The one-year deployment was cut short, however, when the squadron was transferred to Da Nang Air Base in South Vietnam to become the latest Operation Shufly helicopter squadron on 2 October. It was there that the squadron earned the nickname "Ross's Rice Runners", after their commanding officer, Lt Col Tom Ross. On 8 October two squadron UH—34Ds crashed almost simultaneously while on a search and rescue mission 38 miles (61 km) southwest of Da Nang. Both helicopters burned, killing 10 men; the pilots, copilots, the squadron's flight surgeon, and five crewmen. It was unclear if the helicopters had been shot down or collided in mid-air.

On 3 January 1964 another squadron UH-34 was shot down by the Viet Cong 30 miles (48 km) west of Da Nang with no casualties. The squadron completed its Shufly assignment on 1 February having flown 4,236 combat flight hours and just under 7,000 combat sorties.

On 30 July 1965 the squadron returned to Da Nang, joining Marine Aircraft Group 16 (MAG-16). In August the squadron supported Operation Starlite. On 12 August the squadron conducted the first nighttime helicopter assault by Marines during the war when they lifted 2nd Battalion, 3rd Marines into a landing zone 10 miles (16 km) northwest of Da Nang during Operation Midnight. In December the squadron supported Operation Harvest Moon.

The squadron left South Vietnam on 1 April 1966 and returned on 26 May. During this tour the squadron supported Operation Colorado, Operation Hastings, Operation Golden Fleece, and Operation Rio Blanco. Over the course of the seven month deployment, HMM-361 flew 31, 959 sorties, accounting for 10,774 flight hours, performed 2,312 MEDEVACs, and lifted 37, 209 personnel. HMM-361 departed South Vietnam on 16 December returning to MCAF Futenma.

On 16 February 1967 the squadron returned to South Vietnam from Okinawa rejoining MAG-16. In late May the squadron supported Operation Union II. On 3 September 17 of its helicopters were destroyed by People's Army of Vietnam artillery fire while they were parked at Đông Hà Combat Base. This incident would lead to their transfer south to the Marble Mountain Air Facility. On 15 November the squadron flew aboard USS Iwo Jima to become the Special Landing Force (SLF) Alpha helicopter squadron.

On 22 January 1968 the squadron lifted BLT 2nd Battalion, 4th Marines ashore to Camp Evans and then lifted the 1st Battalion, 9th Marines to Khe Sanh Combat Base. On 10 February the squadron was assigned to MAG-16. On 18 May the squadron departed for the U.S. On its return to the U.S. the squadron was attached to Marine Aircraft Group 26 at Marine Corps Air Station New River, North Carolina. It was there that the squadron transitioned to the CH-53D Sea Stallion helicopter and was redesignated Marine Heavy Helicopter Squadron, HMH-361.

In August 1969 the squadron returned to South Vietnam joining Marine Aircraft Group 36 at Phu Bai Combat Base. On 26 September the squadron was transferred to MAG-16.

On 28 January 1970 the squadron departed South Vietnam boarding ships for Marine Corps Air Station Santa Ana in California.

=== Postwar and the 1980s ===
HMH-361 received their first CH-53D Sea Stallion helicopter in 1977, and on 1 June 1979, made their first squadron overseas deployment to MCAS(H) Futema, Okinawa, Japan as part of the new Unit Deployment Program, completing the first of twelve, six-month WestPac deployments on 3 December 1979.

During ramp up for the December 1983-June 1984 UDP, the Flying Tigers practiced Rapid Ground refueling (RGR) procedures with HMLA squadrons from Camp Pendleton and conducted field trails with the Hughes Helicopter Night Vision System (HNVS) night system. The squadron also conducted extensive Night Vision Goggle (NVG) training. The goal was to validate night troop transport during the first NVG troop insertion to be conducted at Team Spirit ’84 in South Korea. The squadron also supported the filming of the movie “The Killing Fields” in October at Camp Pendleton. This was requested because at the time the Flying Tigers had two of the few remaining MCAS(H) Tustin based CH-53As that actually flew in Operation Eagle Pull. The Flying Tigers faced disaster at Team Sprit, the exercise involving U.S. and South Korean forces, when in March 1984 a CH-53D mishap took the lives of 18 U.S. and 11 South Korean Marines. The aircraft involved was part of a six-helicopter flight which took off Pohang Airfield for a 'night insertion' exercise as part of Team Spirit.

In October 1984 the squadron became the first 3rd MAW helicopter squadron to train under the squadron training exercise and employment plan. Finishing this training in May 1985, HMH-361 attained the highest Marine Corps Combat Readiness Evaluation System (MCCRES) grade to date for a rotary wing squadron. During the squadron's ensuing six WestPac deployments under the UDP, the squadron accomplished the first overwater flight to NAS Cubi Point, Republic of the Philippines.

In preparation for their 1985 UDP, the Flying Tigers provided the first four-plane CH-53D detachment to support the 11 MEU (SOC) deployment from Camp Pendleton. Once again, tragedy stuck the squadron shortly after arrival on Okinawa when one of its CH-53Ds on a daytime training flight struck a logging cable, flew into the ground and exploded killing all four aircrew in July 1985. Moving past the mishap, the squadron focused on supporting 1st MAW requirements including providing support for MAG-90 Det “A” at Bear Hunt, Camp Humphreys, South Korea, a Philippines detachment afloat on the USS Dubuque (LPD-8) and a detachment at NAF Atsugi, Japan supporting the offload of the USS Midway in Yokosuka. The Flying Tigers received “Bravo Zulu” (well done) from USS Midway CTF 70, NAF Atsugi, and CG 1st MAW for the successful off load of 845 passengers and 265 cargo pallets in less than two days.

=== The 1990s ===
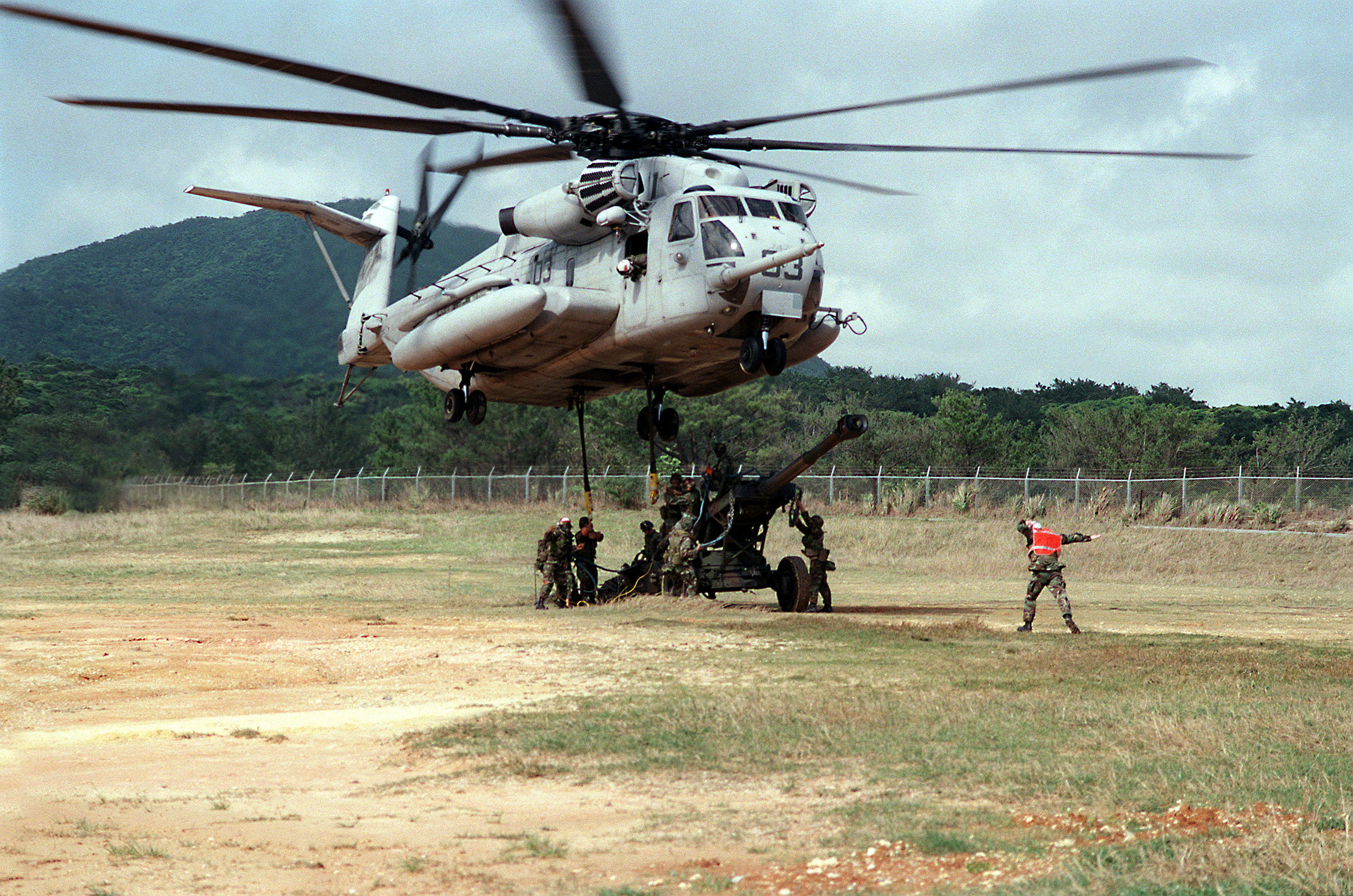
A CH-53 from HMH-361 training in Okinawa in 1995.

The squadron began conversion to the CH-53E Super Stallion on 23 August 1990. On 5 November 1992, the squadron deployed to Okinawa as the Aviation Combat Element (ACE) of the 31st Marine Expeditionary Unit (31st MEU), the first MEU to utilize a CH-53E squadron as the nucleus. Here they were joined by detachments of CH-46Es from HMM-262, AH-1Ws and UH-1Ns from HMLA-267, and AV-8Bs from VMA-311 to become HMH-361 (REIN), the first CH-53E composite squadron in history.

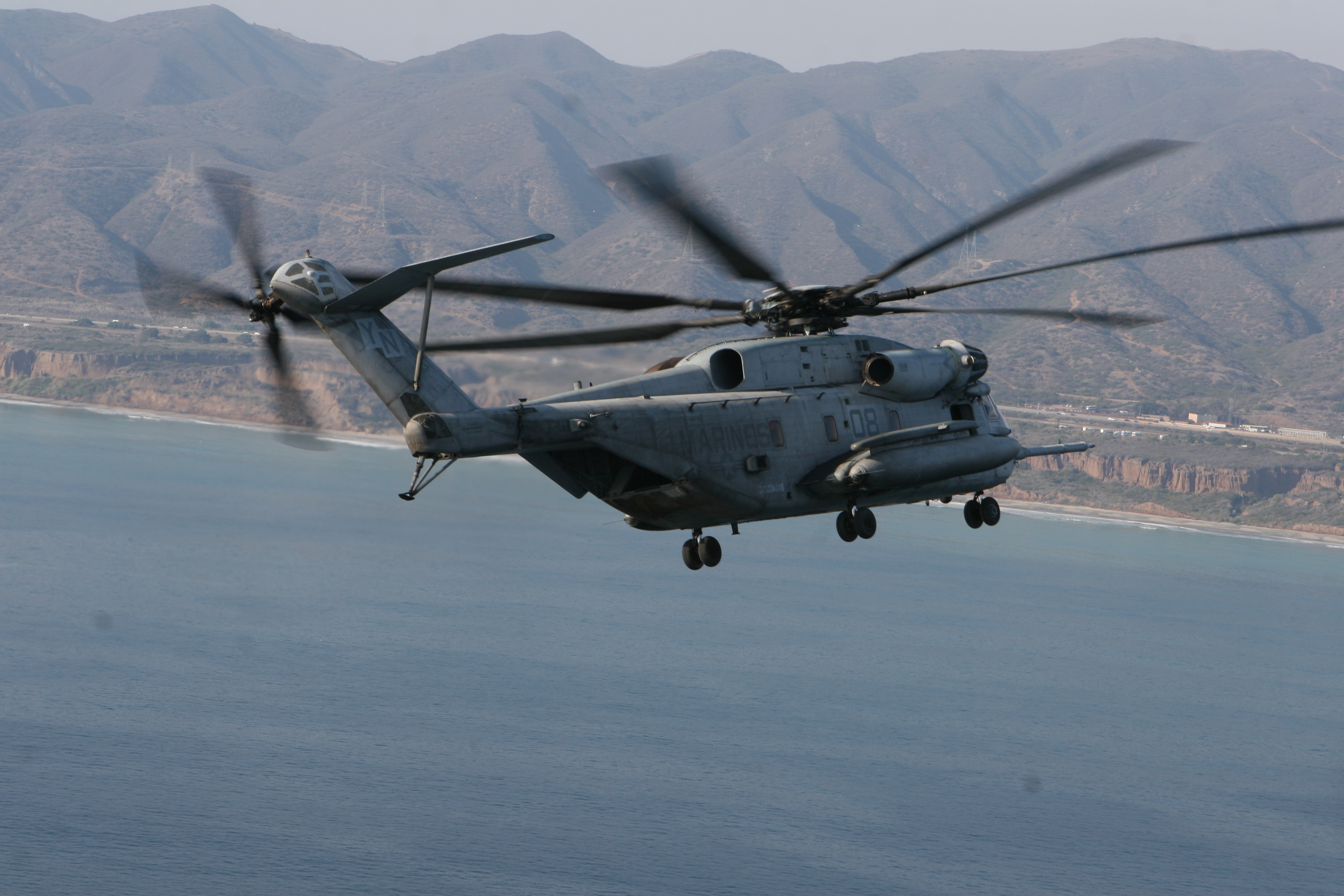
A CH-53E Super Stallion from HMH-361 flying off the coast of Camp Pendleton, California.

In November 1994 the squadron was quadruple sited while on their tenth deployment to Okinawa. Detachments were sent to the 13th and 31st MEU', the Special Purpose Marine Air-Ground task force in support of Operation United Shield while the main body remained on Okinawa.

In August 1995, the squadron was awarded the Marine Corps Aviation Association's Keith B McCutcheon award as Marine Heavy Helicopter squadron of the year and in June 1996 were awarded the 1995 CNO Aviation Association Safety Award.

After returning from Okinawa and reintegrating its MEU detachments in May 1997, the squadron assumed the Alert Contingency Marine air-ground task force (ACM) status. Once again they were awarded the Marine Corps Aviation Association's Keith B McCutcheon award as Marine Heavy Helicopter squadron of the year. The squadron also supported HMX-1 and the President of the United States, transporting three CH-53E's to San Carlos de Bariloche, Argentina, aboard Air Force C-5 Galaxy aircraft.

The squadron deployed from MCAS Tustin for the last time in 1999 and would return to a new home base at MCAS Miramar after the 1993 Base Realignment and Closure Commission ordered the closing of MCAS El Toro and Tustin the transfer of its activities to Marine Corps Air Station Miramar. During the squadron’s 1999 UDP four members of the Flying Tigers were killed when their CH-53E Super Stallion went down at sea during a night-vision goggle training flight off Okinawa.

Returning to MCAS Miramar in mid-1999, the Flying Tigers started preparing for the next deployment. The squadron conducted training throughout the southwest United States, readying the squadron's main-body for deployment to Okinawa, Japan, and CH-53E detachments for the 11th and 31st MEU. In August 2000, the Flying Tigers faced a tremendous training challenge for the upcoming 2001 Unit Deployment Program (UDP). This was due to the grounding of the Marine Corps’ entire fleet of CH-53Es because of a main rotor bearing defect discovered after a Navy MH-53E mishap which destroyed the helicopter and killed four of six aircrew aboard.

The Flying Tigers’ where early adopters of the new technology and had volunteered to install the new Main Rotor Bearing monitoring system as soon as the kits were available at MCAS Miramar. This enabled the Flying Tigers to install six kits and be the first CH-53E squadron to return to flight status in late-September 2000. This way squadron kept on track to deploy four CH-53Es to the 11 MEU (SOC) and two CH-53Es to Marine Weapons and Tactics Squadron (MAWTS)-1 at MCAS Yuma, Arizona. As the rest of the squadron’s helicopter were being returned to flight status, the Flying Tigers kept sharp by conducting training in the flight simulator, conducted logistics drills, and table-top planning exercises in preparation for possible real-world missions such as humanitarian/ disaster relief support and non-combatants evacuation operations. Another first for the Flying Tigers during this workup was having two of the Marine Corps first female aviators in the squadron; Captains S. “Dimes” Deal (#1) and M. “Tink” Rizer (#6) both flying as Helicopter Aircraft Commanders (HAC).

January 2001 the squadron returned to Okinawa and immediately got to work planning for upcoming missions. While in WESTPAC, the Flying Tigers operated as the Aviation Combat Element (ACE) for Marine Air Ground Task Force (MAGTF)-17 during Korean Incremental Training Program (KITP) 01-2 in Pohang, South Korea. Returning from KITP the squadron was asked about the feasibility of long-range regional rotor wing deployment operations supported by KC-130 aerial refueling. The Flying Tigers worked with the “Sumos” of VMGR-152 to develop the Southeast Asian Air-Bridge (SAAB) concept to self-deploy CH-53E from Okinawa to Thailand. The SAAB was nicknamed “Fish Hook” because of the route through Southeast Asia.

From April to June 2001, the Flying Tigers launched on “Fish Hook 2001,” the long range III MEF/ 1stMAW Theater Engagement Operation deploying CH-53Es to the Philippines for BALIKATAN 2001 to conduct aviation and tactical cross-training with the Philippine Marines. After a successful BALIKATAN exercise, the Flying Tigers flew south through Malaysia and Singapore to Hat Yai, Thailand before returning to Okinawa. While flying this mission they were supported by the “Sumos” and F/A-18s from the “Bats” of VMFA-242. During Fish Hook 2001, the squadron also supported Landing Force Cooperation Afloat Readiness and Training (LF CARAT) 2001 in Singkep Indonesia.

After the success of Exercise Fish Hook and LF CARAT, the squadron conducted the first flight of CH-53Es from Okinawa to Guam for Exercise KOA THUNDER before redeploying the squadron to Miramar, California. The Flying Tigers played an essential role in the Commander's, U.S. Pacific Command Theater Engagement Plan while demonstrating the self-deployment capabilities of 1st MAW.

During their deployment the Flying Tigers flew more than 9,000 nautical miles from Okinawa through the Philippines to Thailand, before returning to Okinawa, and then continuing on the first self-deployment to Guam. The squadron received the Meritorious Unit Commendation for its performance during their 2000 - 2001 workup and UDP.

=== Global War of Terror ===
On 26 January 2005, a CH-53E Super Stallion from the unit crashed near Ar Rutbah, Iraq killing all 31 service members on board.

In October 2008 the squadron deployed to the Al Anbar Province, Iraq in support of Operation Iraqi Freedom. Based out of Al Asad Air Base, the squadron was responsible for multiple assault support missions and sorties, as well as delivery of troops, supplies, weapons support, and even delivery of troop mail. The squadron also carried out Angel Flight missions and Quick Reaction Force (QRF) missions. The squadron maintained a combat readiness above 95% during the deployment and was later awarded the Meritorious Unit Citation for its distinguished efforts while in the theater. The unit returned home to Marine Corps Air Station Miramar, California, in late May 2008 (advanced party) and early June 2008 (main body).

In February 2009, the squadron again deployed to the Al Anbar Province, Iraq in support of Operation Iraqi Freedom. Operating out of Al Asad Air Base, the squadron was responsible for multiple assault support missions and sorties, as well as delivery of troops, supplies, weapons support, and even delivery of troop mail. The squadron also carried out Angel Flight missions, MAGTF Support/Raid Missions and QRF. The squadron maintained a combat readiness above 93% during the deployment and was later awarded another Meritorious Unit Citation for its distinguished efforts while in the theater. The unit returned home to Marine Corps Air Station Miramar in California in late July 2009 (advanced party) and early September 2009 (main body).

In August 2010 HMH-361 deployed to Afghanistan in support of Operation Enduring Freedom. They were based at Camp Leatherneck and returned to the U.S. in early 2011.

In August 2012 HMH-361 again deployed to Afghanistan in support of Operation Enduring Freedom, where they took part in fending off a Taliban attack on the British Camp Bastion airfield on 14 September 2012. The squadron returned to the United States in February 2013.

In April 2013, upon return from their deployment to Afghanistan, HMH-361 was announced as the recipient of the Keith B McCutcheon Marine Heavy Helicopter Squadron of the year award.

=== 2024 Crash ===
On 7 February 2024, a CH-53E of HMH-361 crashed in Pine Valley, California, about 44 miles east of San Diego. The aircraft was flying a training flight from Creech Air Force Base to MCAS Miramar. The aircraft was reported “overdue.” Upon investigation by search and rescue personnel, the five Marines aboard were reported to have been killed in the crash.

On 25 November 2024, after the squadron returned from a unit deployment, the commanding officer, LtCol Nicholas J. Harvey was relieved of command due to a loss of trust and confidence in his abilities to lead, stemming from the mishap of Tiger 43.

== See also ==
- United States Marine Corps Aviation
- Organization of the United States Marine Corps
- List of active United States Marine Corps aircraft squadrons
