= J. J. McCarthy (disambiguation) =

J. J. McCarthy (born 2003) is an American football player.

J. J. McCarthy may also refer to:

- James Joseph McCarthy (1817–1882), Irish architect
- John Joseph McCarthy (1896–1983), Irish prelate
- Joseph J. McCarthy (1911–1996), American army officer
