= 263 Squadron =

263 Squadron may refer to:

- No. 263 Squadron RAF
- VMM-263, United States Marine Corps
