= 2nd Battalion, 24th Marines =

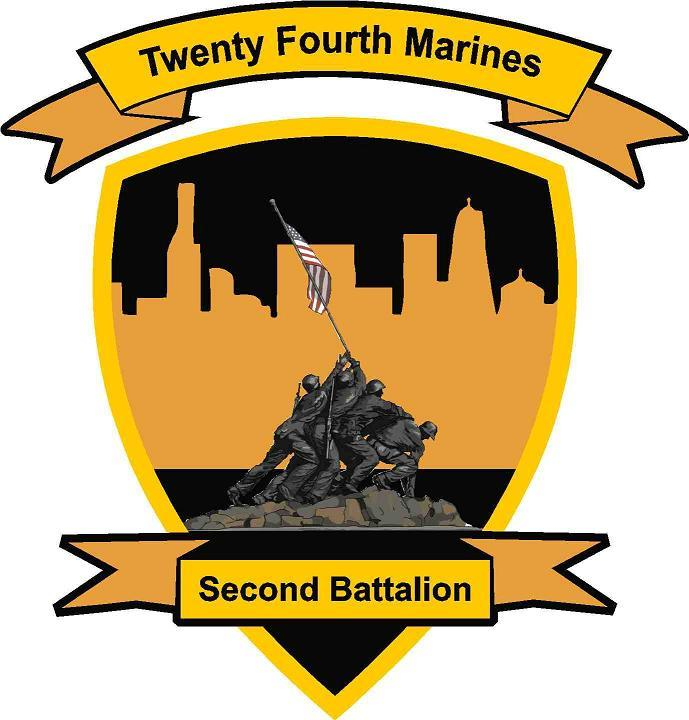
- 2nd Battalion, 24th Marines insignia
- Active: 1922–present
- Country: United States of America
- Branch: United States Marine Corps
- Type: Infantry
- Role: Ground Unit
- Size: 400
- Part of: 24th Marine Regiment; 4th Marine Division
- Garrison/HQ: Fort Sheridan, Illinois
- Nickname(s): Mad Ghosts
- Motto(s): First in Last out Chicago’s Own
- Colors: Black & Gold
- March: Marine Corps Hymn
- Mascot(s): Bulldog
- Engagements: World War II; *Battle of Saipan; *Battle of Tinian; *Battle of Iwo Jima; Operation Desert Storm; Operation Iraqi Freedom; *Operation Plymouth Rock

Commanders
- Current commander: LtCol David A. Mabon
- Notable commanders: LtCol Joseph J. McCarthy, MoH; Frank E. Garretson, NC

2nd Battalion, 24th Marines (2/24) is a reserve infantry battalion in the United States Marine Corps based out of Chicago, Illinois, consisting of approximately 1000 Marines and Sailors. The battalion falls under the 23rd Marine Regiment and the 4th Marine Division.

== Subordinate units ==
Name	Location
Headquarters and Service Company	Fort Sheridan, Illinois
Echo Company	Des Moines, Iowa
Fox Company	Milwaukee, Wisconsin
Golf Company	Madison, Wisconsin
Weapons Company	Joliet, Illinois

== Mission ==
Provide trained combat and combat support personnel and units to augment and reinforce the active component in time of war, national emergency, and at other times as national security requires; and have the capability to reconstitute the 4th Marine Division, if required.

== History ==
=== Founding ===
The origin of 2nd Battalion, 24th Marines can be traced back to the establishment of the 9th Reserve Battalion in 1922. They were mobilized in November 1940 as part of the preparation for World War II. Many of Chicago's reservists became part of the newly founded 2nd Battalion, 24th Marines, 4th Marine Division, Fleet Marine Force.

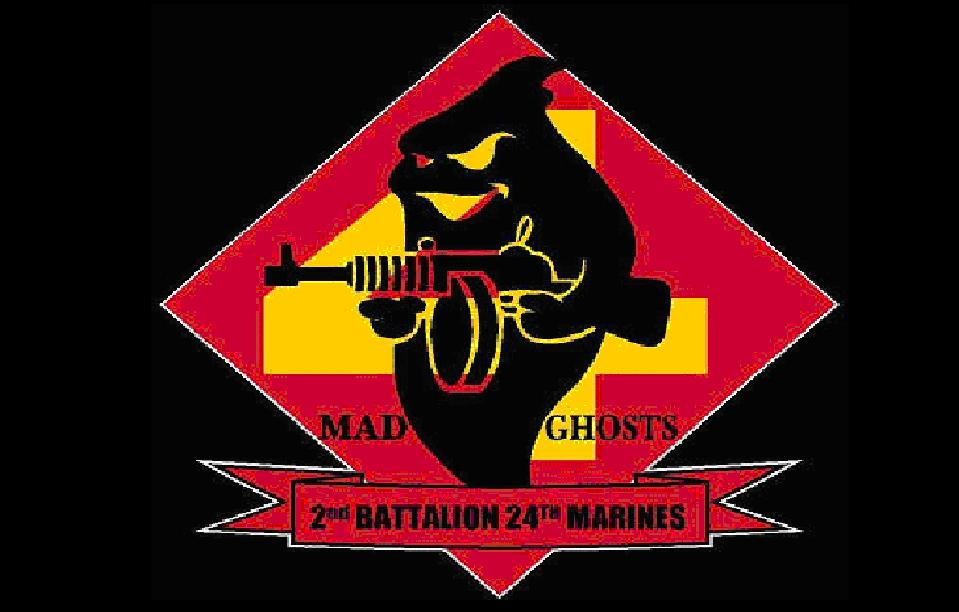
The Mad Ghosts

=== World War II ===
2nd Battalion, 24th Marines was activated on 26 March 1943, as part of the 4th Marine Division. Their first action was the invasion of the Marshall Islands on 1 February 1944, securing the first portion of the Japanese Empire to be conquered by the United States in World War II.

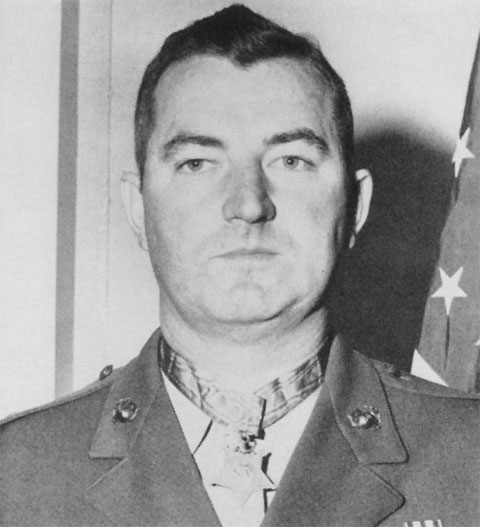
Capt.Joseph J. McCarthy of 2/24 G Co..

On 15 June 1944, the battalion landed on Saipan in the Marianas. Fifteen days after Saipan was secured, they assaulted the island of Tinian, securing that island in eight days. 2/24, received its first Presidential Unit Citation for the capture of Saipan and Tinian.

On 19 February 1945, 2nd Battalion, 24th Marines landed on Iwo Jima and fought for 35 days until the island was finally secured on 26 March 1945. From D-day until the 24th RCT relieved the 25th RCT the Seabees of the 133rd NCB were the 2nd Battalions Shore party. The Battalion was awarded a second Presidential Unit Citation for its participation in the capture of Iwo Jima. Captain Joseph J. McCarthy, Commanding Officer, Co. G, 2nd Battalion, 24th Marines, and a Chief in the Chicago Fire Department, was awarded the Medal of Honor for his gallantry during the battle. The battalion was demobilized on 31 October 1945.

=== Korean War ===
In October 1950, they were mobilized and sent to Camp Pendleton, California, for further transfer to Korea, where Chicago Marines saw combat during the Korean War.

=== Gulf War ===
On 30 November 1990, the battalion was mobilized as a result of the Presidential call up in support of Operation Desert Shield. Training and final preparation for the war in the desert was conducted at Camp Lejeune, North Carolina, during December 1990. Upon the battalion's arrival in the Kingdom of Saudi Arabia, it was assigned the mission of security for critical facilities.

The 2nd Battalion, 24th Marines were initially assigned the mission of protecting the I Marine Expeditionary Force commander's primary bases in Northern Saudi Arabia, to include the Naval Air Field at Al Jubail, the ammunition storage site near Abu Hadriah and the defense of I MEF headquarters at Ras Safanya and Marine Aircraft Group 16 at Tanajib, thus providing security for an area over 40 miles wide and 135 miles deep. Echo company provided security for Ras Al Mishab just south of Khafji and 1st platoon was pulled to the Battle of Ras Al Khadijah. After the town was taken elements of Echo Company provided security for the Navy Seabees while they were in the town. Even after some units took on enemy fire from Iraqi artillery the unit never received a combat action award.

As Operation Desert Storm commenced, the area of responsibility increased further west to Kibrit and north to Al Khanjar. During the ground war, 2nd Battalion, 24th Marines provided security to the largest ammunition supply point in the country, at the loss of which would have critically impaired the ground offensive. During the liberation of Kuwait, elements of 2nd Battalion, 24th Marines provided security to I Marine Expeditionary Force Command Post in Kuwait. Additionally, they took up defensive positions at Al Jaber Airfield south of Kuwait City.

While maintaining its mission of providing security, 2nd Battalion, 24th Marines was also responsible for the handling and processing of over 10,300 enemy prisoners of war in a 96-hour period. The battalion returned to Chicago on 12 May 1991, after 5 months of deployment, with 3½ months in Southwest Asia.

=== Global War on Terror ===
Chicago's Own was mobilized again in June 2004 in support of Operation Iraqi Freedom (OIF). The battalion trained at Camp Pendleton until Sept. of that year when they relocated to Mahmudiyah, in the North Babil Province of Iraq, an area known as the "Triangle of Death". The battalion was engaged in intense combat operations against members of the Iraqi insurgency. 2/24 made Marine Corps history when they became the first reserve infantry battalion of OIF to operate independently, isolated on its own forward operating base.

Two-time Pulitzer Prize Winner John F. Burns, the Chief Foreign Correspondent of The New York Times described his time spent with 2/24 this way: "A week with the 2/24 Marines at their bases 15 to 30 miles south of Baghdad, in the heart of the area known as the Triangle of Death, was a window on the demands being made of reservists, and on the resourcefulness and resilience they bring to the challenges. There is little they cannot do, with hard work and improvisation, the battalion's officers say, reflecting the widely varied backgrounds of the men in the Chicago-based unit - doctors, policemen, engineers, teachers, carpenters, truck drivers, lawyers, computer specialists, community counselors, college students, to name a few."

After establishing additional strong points in the area, working closely with the Iraqi Army and Police, providing security for the first-ever open democratic elections in Iraq and arresting over 1,000 suspected insurgents (with an incredibly high conviction rate,) 2/24 returned to California in March 2005. They deactivated in May 2005.

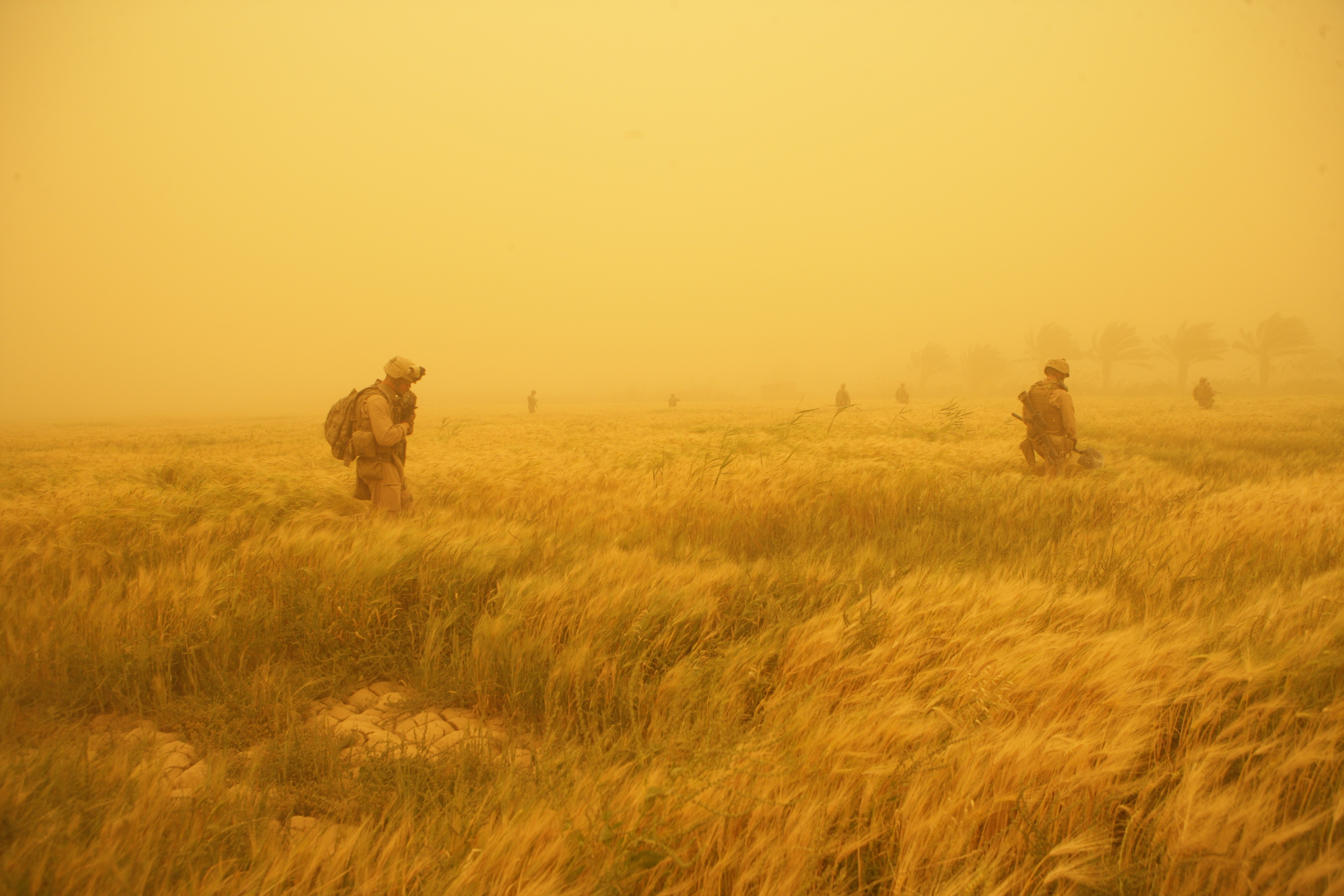
Marines with Company F, 2nd Battalion, 24th Marine Regiments search a field during a dust storm for weapons caches in Khalidiyah, Iraq on April 17, 2008.

In March 2006, elements of 2/24 participated in Operation Shared Accord in Niger. The Marines taught basic military tactics to groups of soldiers from the Forces Armees Nigeriennes and also provided humanitarian support to some of Niger's neediest citizens. In May 2006, Echo Company of 2/24 participated in Operation Noble Shirley in Israel by conducting desert warfare and joint counter-terrorism training with the Israeli Defense Forces [IDF].

On September 10, 2007, 2nd Battalion, 24th Marines were once again activated in support of Operation Iraqi Freedom, and relocated to Marine Corps Air Ground Combat Center Twentynine Palms, California. The battalion began another tour in Iraq beginning in January 2008 and operated in the vicinity of Habbaniyah, operating out of base formerly known as RAF Habbaniya. On August 10, 2008, they turned over their area of operations to 1st Battalion, 2nd Marines and returned stateside in late August.

== See also ==
- List of United States Marine Corps battalions
- Naval Mobile Construction Battalion 133
- Organization of the United States Marine Corps
- The Triangle of Death (documentary) 2nd Battalion 24th Marines 2004-2005 deployment.
