= Roger E. Combs =

United States Air Force general (1945–2018)

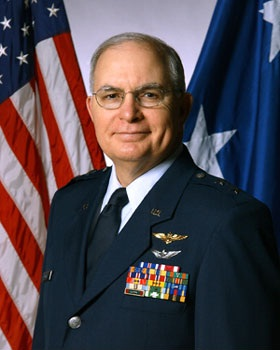
- Born: February 22, 1945
- Died: August 22, 2018 (aged 73)
- Military career
- Allegiance: United States
- Branch: United States Marine Corps; United States Army; United States Air Force
- Service years: 1968-2007
- Rank: Major General
- Conflicts: Vietnam War
- Awards: Air Force Distinguished Service Medal; Legion of Merit; Distinguished Flying Cross
- Other work: Associate Circuit Judge, Missouri 4th Judicial Circuit

Roger E. Combs (February 22, 1945 – August 22, 2018) was an American major general in the Air National Guard and an Associate Circuit Judge in Missouri's 4th Judicial Circuit. His last military assignment was as Director of Strategic Plans and Policy (J-5) for the National Guard Bureau. Previously, General Combs served as Assistant Adjutant General-Air and deputy commander of Joint Forces Headquarters, Missouri. He also served as the Air National Guard assistant to the commander, First Air Force, at Tyndall Air Force Base, Florida.

== Military career ==
Combs began his military career by attending United States Marine Corps Officer Candidate School in 1968. After designation as a naval aviator, he served a tour of duty in Vietnam as a CH-46 combat helicopter pilot with HMM-364, Marble Mountain Air Facility, Republic of Vietnam from 1969 to 1970. During his time with HMM-364 he was a helicopter second pilot, aircraft commander/squadron administrative officer, section leader, division leader/assistant operations officer, and flight leader. Upon returning to the United States Combs briefly served as assistant officer selection officer at United States Marine Corps Recruit Station, Kansas City before joining HMM-263, Marine Corps Air Facility Quantico.

Leaving active duty in 1973, Combs joined the 635th Aviation Company, Missouri Army National Guard where he was a UH-1 aircraft commander. In 1981, he transferred to the Missouri Air National Guard where he then served a number of years as director of intelligence for a C-130 Hercules Airlift Wing.

After transferring to Headquarters, Missouri Air National Guard, Combs became engaged in, and became nationally recognized for his expertise in long range and strategic planning. He served as the state plans and programs officer and later served as the Assistant Adjutant General-Air, Missouri National Guard.

His last military assignment was as the Director of Strategic Plans and Policy (J-5) for the National Guard Bureau. In this position he was responsible to the Chief of the National Guard Bureau to develop, promulgate and implement policy, plans, concepts and strategy for the nearly half million citizen soldiers and airmen of the Army and Air National Guard. His duties touched and concerned war-fighting, peacetime international activities and aspects of the federal and state homeland security and civil support missions of both the National Guard Bureau and the corporate National Guard. The mission scope of the J-5 Directorate also includes representing the Chief of the National Guard Bureau in Department of Defense, inter-agency, intergovernmental and non-governmental forums. He was a member of the Air Reserve Forces Policy Committee.

While he holds no United States Air Force rating, he is an aircraft commander who has earned ratings as a Naval Aviator and a Senior Army Aviator. He has over 2,500 flying hours in four types of rotary wing aircraft including more than 500 hours of combat time in a CH-46.

=== Promotions ===
- Second Lieutenant, May 5, 1968
- First Lieutenant, July 1, 1969
- Captain, April 1, 1971
- Major, April 11, 1981
- Lieutenant Colonel, May 2, 1989
- Colonel, December 4, 1994
- Brigadier General, November 7, 1999
- Major General, March 15, 2004

=== Awards and decorations ===
- Air Force Distinguished Service Medal
- Legion of Merit
- Distinguished Flying Cross
- Meritorious Service Medal
- Air Medal with Gold star and Strike/Flight numerals "37"
- Air Force Commendation Medal
- Navy Achievement Medal Valor
- Air Force Outstanding Unit Award
- Air Force Organizational Excellence Award
- Navy Meritorious Unit Commendation
- National Defense Service Medal
- Vietnam Service Medal
- Air Force Longevity Service Award
- Armed Forces Reserve Medal with silver hourglass device
- Small Arms Expert Marksmanship Ribbon with bronze service star
- Air Force Training Ribbon
- Civil Actions Medal Unit Citation (Vietnam)
- Campaign Medal (Vietnam)
- Missouri Meritorious Service Medal
- Missouri National Guard 20 Year Long Service Ribbon with silver hawthorn cluster (30 years service)

=== Other Achievements ===
- National Guard Association of the United States Distinguished Service Medal, 2003

== Civilian career ==
A 1975 graduate of the University of Missouri School of Law, Combs practiced law in St Joseph, Missouri. He later served as Gentry County Prosecuting Attorney for 10 years. Combs was an Associate Circuit Judge in Missouri's 4th Judicial Circuit.

== Education ==
- 1968 Bachelor of Science degree, University of Missouri.
- 1975 Juris Doctor degree, University of Missouri.
- 1983 United States Marine Corps Command and Staff College, by correspondence
- 1988 National Security Management Course

== Death ==
Combs died at his home in King City, Missouri on August 22, 2018. He is inurned at Arlington National Cemetery.
