= Raymond M. Clausen Jr. =

United States Marine (1947–2004)

Raymond Michael Clausen Jr.
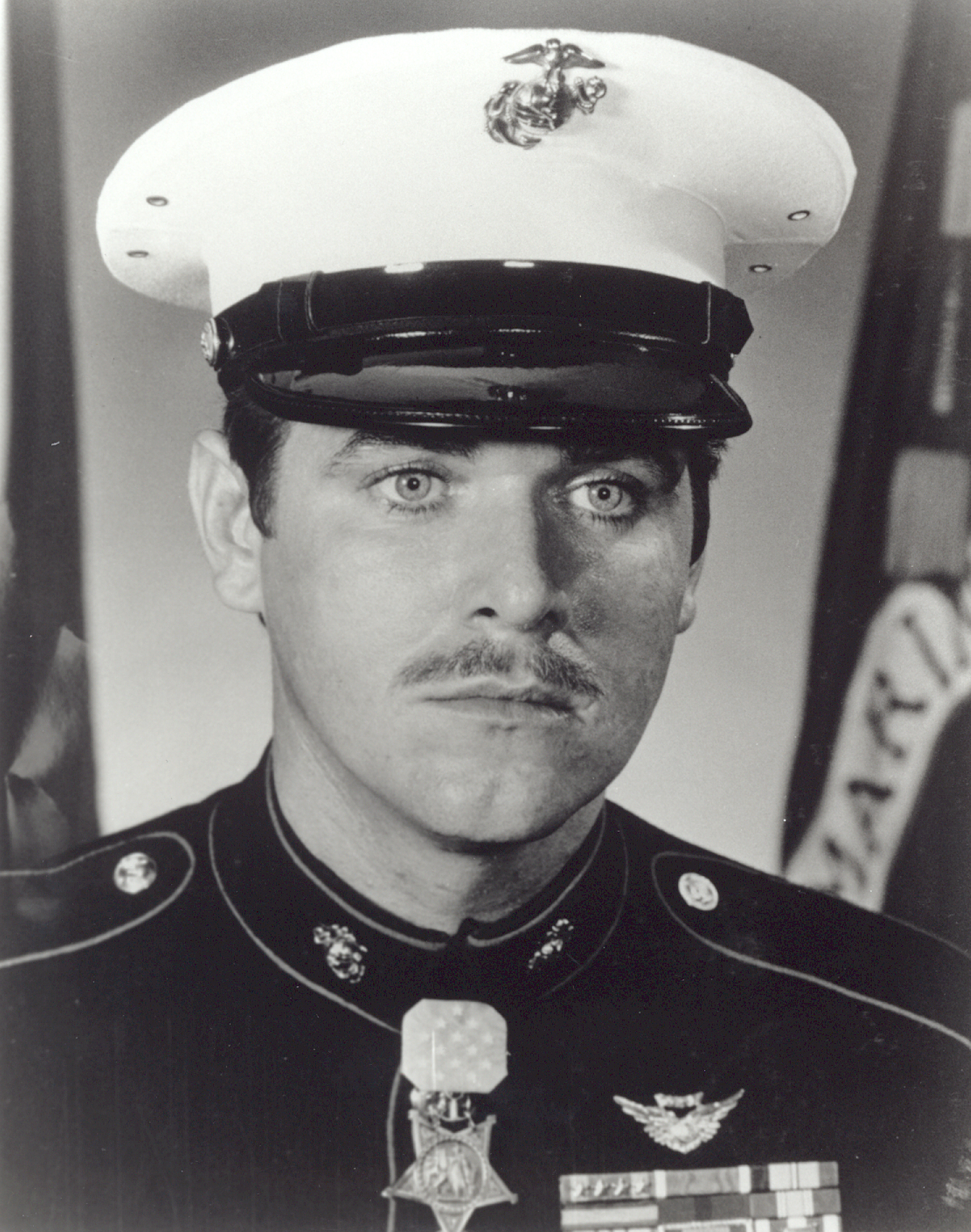
- Pvt. Raymond M. Clausen Jr., Medal of Honor recipient
- Born: October 14, 1947; New Orleans, Louisiana
- Died: May 30, 2004 (aged 56); Dallas, Texas
- Burial place: Ponchatoula Cemetery Ponchatoula, Louisiana
- Military career
- Allegiance: United States of America
- Branch: United States Marine Corps
- Service years: 1966–1970
- Rank: Private First Class
- Nickname: "Mike"
- Unit: HMM-263
- Conflicts: Vietnam War
- Awards: Medal of Honor; Purple Heart

Raymond Michael Clausen Jr. (October 14, 1947 – May 30, 2004) was a United States Marine who received the Medal of Honor for heroism in Vietnam in January 1970. On a mission to rescue Marines from a minefield, under heavy enemy fire, he carried out one dead and eleven wounded Marines, making six trips through the minefield until every Marine was extracted.

== Biography ==
Clausen was born on October 14, 1947, in New Orleans, Louisiana. He graduated from Hammond High School (Louisiana) in 1965 and attended Southeastern Louisiana University for six months before enlisting in the U.S. Marine Corps Reserve in New Orleans on March 30, 1966. He was discharged to enlist in the regular Marine Corps on May 27, 1966.

Private Clausen received recruit training with the 3rd Recruit Training Battalion, Recruit Training Regiment, Marine Corps Recruit Depot, San Diego, California, and individual combat training with the 3rd Battalion, 2nd Infantry Training Regiment at Camp Pendleton, California. He then completed Aviation Mechanical Fundamentals School and the Basic Helicopter Course at Naval Air Technical Training Center in Memphis, Tennessee.

He completed his training in April 1967 and was transferred to Marine Aircraft Group 26 (MAG-26), Marine Corps Air Facility, New River, Jacksonville, North Carolina, where he served as a jet engine mechanic with Marine Medium Helicopter Squadron 365 (HMM-365) and, later, as a guard with Marine Air Base Squadron 26 (MABS-26).

In December 1967, Private First Class Clausen was ordered overseas to serve as a jet helicopter mechanic, which he did throughout his tour of active duty service. He joined the 1st Marine Aircraft Wing, Fleet Marine Force, Pacific, with Headquarters and Maintenance Squadron 36 (H&MS-36), Marine Aircraft Group 36 (MAG-36) until September 1968, then with HMM-364, Marine Aircraft Group 16 (MAG-16) until the following August. PFC Clausen then returned to the United States, where he joined Marine Aircraft Group 26 (MAG-26) at Marine Corps Air Station New River for duty with HMM-261.

He began his second tour of duty in November 1969 with HMM-263, MAG-16, 1st Marine Aircraft Wing, Fleet Marine Force, Pacific. On January 31, 1970, as part of a mission to rescue Marines who were stranded in a minefield near Da Nang, under heavy enemy fire, he made six trips out of his CH-46 Sea Knight helicopter through the minefield, carrying back eleven wounded Marines and one dead until the last Marine was accounted for.

On August 19, 1970, upon his return to the United States, he was released from active duty at the rank of PFC.

On June 15, 1971, he was presented the Medal of Honor by President Richard M. Nixon in a ceremony at the White House.

Private First Class Clausen died at the age of 56 on May 30, 2004, at Baylor University Medical Center, Dallas, Texas, due to liver failure. He was buried at Ponchatoula Cemetery in Ponchatoula, Louisiana, with full military honors.

== Awards and decorations ==
A complete list of his medals and decorations include: the United States Marine Corps Combat Aircrew Badge, the Medal of Honor, the Air Medal (with four Gold Stars); the Combat Action Ribbon; the Purple Heart; the Presidential Unit Citation; the Good Conduct Medal; the National Defense Service Medal; the Vietnam Service Medal with one silver star and one bronze star; the Republic of Vietnam Cross of Gallantry with Palm; the Vietnam Campaign Medal with device; and the Rifle Sharpshooter Badge.

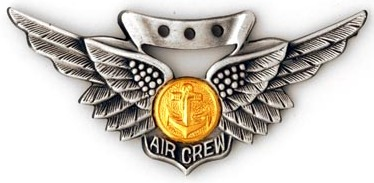

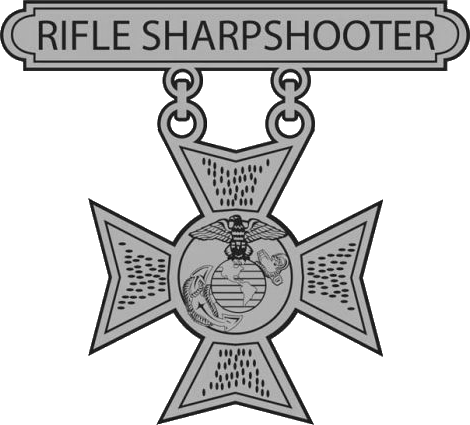

United States Marine Corps Combat Aircrew Badge with two gold combat stars
Medal of Honor		Purple Heart	
Air Medal with four gold stars	Combat Action Ribbon	Navy Presidential Unit Citation	Marine Corps Good Conduct Medal
National Defense Service Medal	Vietnam Service Medal with one silver and one bronze star	Vietnam Gallantry Cross Unit Citation	Republic of Vietnam Campaign Medal
Marine Corps Sharpshooter Badge

== Medal of Honor citation ==
The President of the United States in the name of The Congress takes pleasure in presenting the MEDAL OF HONOR to

PRIVATE FIRST CLASS RAYMOND M. CLAUSEN, JR.
UNITED STATES MARINE CORPS

for service as set forth in the following CITATION:

For conspicuous gallantry and intrepidity at the risk of his life above and beyond the call of duty while serving with Marine Medium Helicopter Squadron 263, Marine Aircraft Group 16, First Marine Aircraft Wing, during operations against enemy forces in the Republic of Vietnam on January 31, 1970. Participating in a helicopter rescue mission to extract elements of a platoon which had inadvertently entered a minefield while attacking enemy positions, Private First Class Clausen skillfully guided the helicopter pilot to a landing in an area cleared by one of several mine explosions. With eleven Marines wounded, one dead, and the remaining eight Marines holding their positions for fear of detonating other mines, Private First Class Clausen quickly leaped from the helicopter and, in the face of enemy fire, moved across the extremely hazardous, mine-laden area to assist in carrying casualties to the waiting helicopter and in placing them aboard. Despite the ever-present threat of further mine explosions, he continued his valiant efforts, leaving the comparatively safe area of the helicopter on six separate occasions to carry out his rescue efforts. On one occasion while he was carrying one of the wounded, another mine detonated, killing a corpsman and wounding three other men. Only when he was certain that all Marines were safely aboard did he signal the pilot to lift the helicopter. By his courageous, determined and inspiring efforts in the face of the utmost danger, Private First Class Clausen upheld the highest traditions of the Marine Corps and of the United States Naval Service.

/S/ RICHARD M. NIXON

== Posthumous honors ==
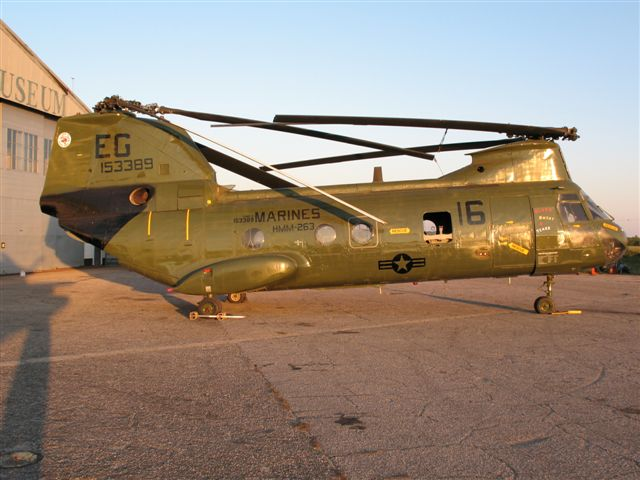
Mike Clausen's CH-46 preserved at the Carolina Aviation Museum

The CH-46D Sea Knight helicopter from which Clausen rescued his fellow Marines, was dedicated on October 20, 2007, at the Sullenberger Aviation Museum in Charlotte, North Carolina. Since January 1970, the helicopter has been in active service, until March 2004, when it had a hard landing in Iraq during Operation Iraqi Freedom. It has been restored as it had been during its Vietnam War service.

== See also ==
- List of Medal of Honor recipients
- List of Medal of Honor recipients for the Vietnam War
