= Eugene R. Brady =

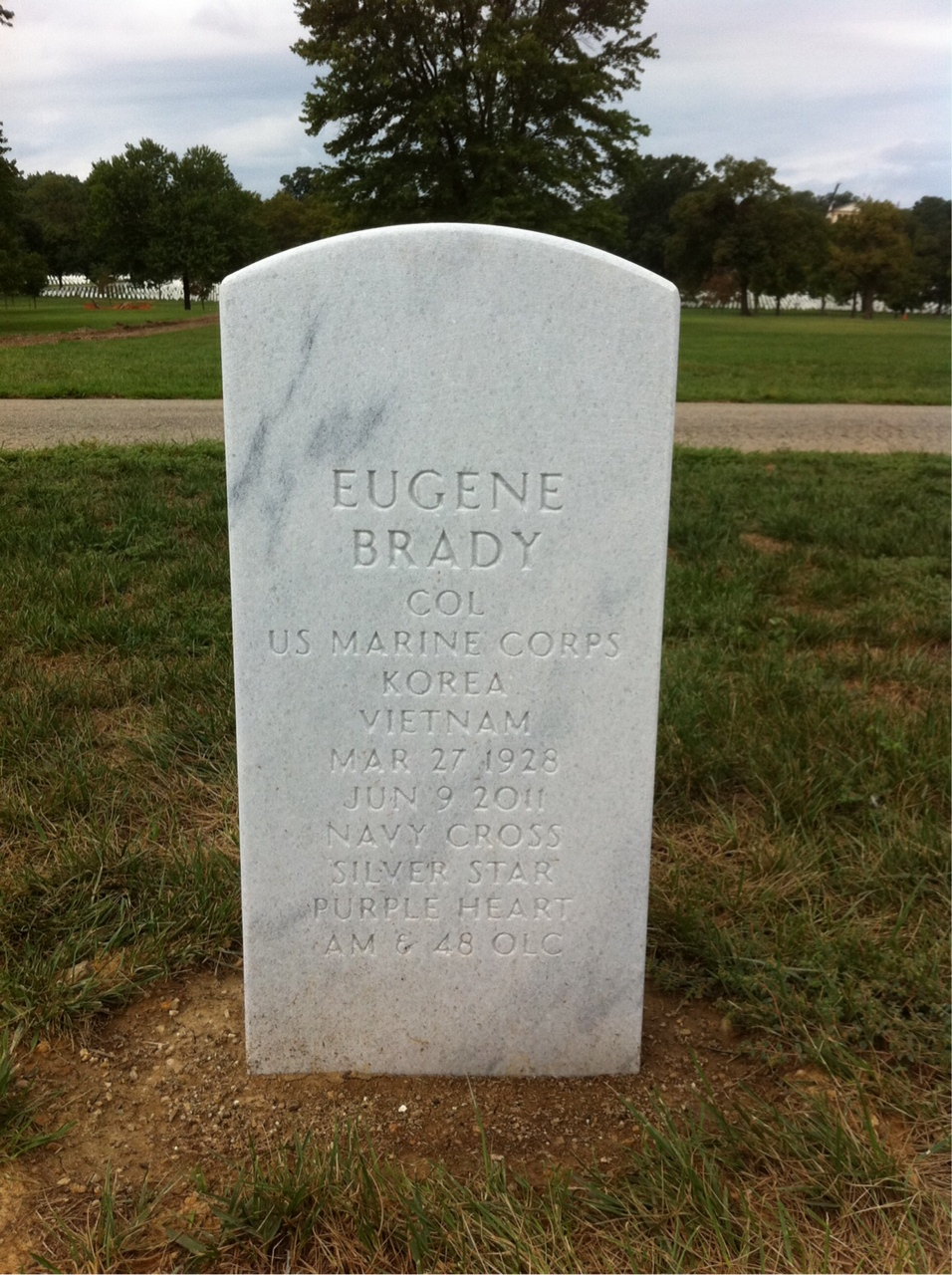
- Grave at Arlington National Cemetery
- Born: March 27, 1928; York, Pennsylvania
- Died: June 9, 2011 (aged 83)
- Burial place: Arlington National Cemetery
- Military career
- Branch: United States Marine Corps
- Service years: 4 June 1946 – 1 October 1980
- Rank: Colonel
- Commands: MABS-33; HMM-364; MCAS(H) Tustin; MAG-16
- Wars: Korean War; Vietnam War
- Awards: Navy Cross; Silver Star; Legion of Merit with Combat "V"; Purple Heart

Eugene R. Brady (1928-2011) was a United States Marine Corps officer and naval aviator who was the recipient of the Navy Cross and a later Silver Star for his heroic actions during two separate medevac missions taking wounded Marines from a landing zone while under fire during the Vietnam War. At the time of these awards, he was serving as the commanding officer of HMM-364, The Purple Foxes. He began his career as a fixed wing pilot and saw service in the Korean War with VMF-311. He did not transition to flying helicopters until 1968. During the course of his career he commanded four different squadrons, Marine Corps Air Station Tustin and Marine Aircraft Group 16. Colonel Brady retired from the Marine Corps in 1980 after more than 34 years of service.

== Early life and career ==
Eugene R. Brady was born on March 27, 1928, in York, Pennsylvania.

He enlisted into the United States Marine Corps on June 4, 1946. After completing recruit training at Marine Corps Recruit Depot Parris Island, South Carolina, he was stationed at Marine Corps Air Station Cherry Point, North Carolina. He was selected for the Aviation Cadet Training Program in June 1949. He was commissioned a second lieutenant in the Marine Corps and designated a Naval Aviator on December 18, 1950.

== Korean War and the remainder of the 1950s ==
His first assignment out of flight school was flying McDonnell F2H-2 Banshees with VMF-122 at MCAS Cherry Point from December 1950 to May 1951. He remained at MCAS Cherry Point and next flew the Grumman F9F-2 Panther with VMF-223 from May to December 1951. In January 1952 he deployed to South Korea and flew 78 combat missions in F9F-2s with VMF-311 out of K-3 in Pohang from January to July 1952. He remained in South Korea from July to September 1952 as the assistant provost marshal with Marine Air Base Squadron 33 (MABS-33) at K-3.

In September 1952 he returned to MCAS Cherry Point, where he joined VMR-252 flying the R4Q Packet. He remained as a pilot with -252 until July 1954 when he was moved to be the assistant Operations Officer at Headquarters and Maintenance Squadron 35 (H&MS-35). From September 1954 until October 1955 he also served as an assistant operations officer for the 2nd Marine Aircraft Wing. From November 1955 until September 1957 he was assigned as the assistant inspector with aircraft, Fleet Marine Force, Atlantic at Naval Air Station Norfolk, Virginia. After that he was assigned to Naval Air Station Corpus Christi, Texas, as a flight instructor from September 1957 to March 1959. Brady returned to the Fleet Marine Force in March 1959 serving as the aide-de-camp to Major General Carson A. Roberts, commanding general of the 1st Marine Aircraft Wing at Marine Corps Air Station Iwakuni, Japan. In November 1959 he was transferred to the 3rd Marine Aircraft Wing at Marine Corps Air Station El Toro, California, where he again served as the aide-de-camp to the commanding general until December 1960.

== 1960s & the Vietnam War ==
Beginning in December 1960, Maj Brady served as the executive officer for VMF(AW)-542. He remained in this role until December 1963 when the squadron returned to MCAS El Toro from Naval Air Station Atsugi, Japan.

Assigned to Marine Corps Air Station Quantico in November 1963, he served as assistant station operations officer, commanding officer of H&HS Battalion, and executive officer and commanding officer of Stations Operations and Engineering Squadron Quantico (SOES Quantico) until September 1966. He attended George Washington University in Washington, D.C., until his graduation in May 1967.

Following four months of refresher training at MCAS El Toro with VMA-214, he was assigned ultimately as commanding officer of MABS-33 from December 1967 through July 1968. In July he reported to Marine Helicopter Training Group 30 (MHTG-30) at MCAS Tustin for Helicopter Transition Training. He arrived in South Vietnam in October 1968 serving as the operations officer for Marine Aircraft Group 16 at Marble Mountain Airfield. From January to August 1969 he served as the commanding officer of HMM-364. During his time with the squadron, he was awarded the Navy Cross, Silver Star and Purple Heart for his action flying in combat.

== 1970s and later career ==
In October 1969, Brady was assigned to Headquarters Marine Corps at the Pentagon and stayed in this role until July 1971. He was selected to attend the Army War College at Carlisle Barracks, Pennsylvania, graduating in June 1972. This was followed by short stint at Shippensburg State College, Pennsylvania, where he earned his master's degree in August 1972. Newly promoted to colonel, his next assignment was as the commanding officer of Marine Corps Air Station Tustin, California, from August 1972 to July 1974. This was followed by another command tour with Marine Aircraft Group 16 which began at MCAS Tustin and later moved to Marine Corps Air Facility Camp Pendleton from July 1974 to June 1975. Following back to back successful command tours he served as the chief of staff for Marine Corps Base Camp Smedley D. Butler in Okinawa, from July 1975 to December 1977. In January 1978 he began serving as the special assistant to the commander of U.S. Naval Forces Korea in South Korea and to the commandant of the Republic of Korea Marine Corps. His final assignment was as inspector with the commander, Marine Corps Air Bases Western Area at MCAS El Toro from January 1980 until his retirement from the Marine Corps on October 1, 1980.

== Retirement & later life ==
Colonel Eugene Brady died on June 9, 2011.

== Navy Cross citation ==
The President of the United States of America takes pleasure in presenting the Navy Cross to

Lieutenant Colonel Eugene R. Brady (MCSN: 0–51664), United States Marine Corps

for extraordinary heroism and intrepidity in action while serving as Commanding Officer of Marine Medium Helicopter Squadron THREE HUNDRED SIXTY-FOUR (HMM-364), Marine Aircraft Group SIXTEEN (MAG-16), First Marine Aircraft Wing, in connection with combat operations against the enemy in the Republic of Vietnam. On 15 May 1969, Lieutenant Colonel Brady launched as Aircraft Commander of a transport helicopter assigned the mission of medically evacuating several seriously wounded Marines from an area northwest of An Hoa in Quang Nam Province. Arriving over the designated location, he was advised by the ground commander that the vastly outnumbered unit was surrounded by the enemy, some as close as thirty meters to the Marines' positions. Fully aware of the dangers involved, and despite rapidly approaching darkness and deteriorating weather conditions, Lieutenant Colonel Brady elected to complete his mission. As he commenced a high-speed, low-altitude approach to the confined zone, he came under a heavy volume of hostile automatic weapons fire which damaged his aircraft but did not deter him from landing. During the considerable period of time required to embark the casualties, the landing zone was subjected to intense enemy mortar fire, several rounds of which landed perilously close to the transport, rendering additional damage to the helicopter. However, Lieutenant Colonel Brady displayed exceptional composure as he calmly relayed hostile firing positions to fixed-wing aircraft overhead and steadfastly remained in his dangerously exposed position until all the wounded men were safely aboard. Demonstrating superb airmanship, he then executed a series of evasive maneuvers as he lifted from the fire-swept zone, and subsequently delivered the casualties to the nearest medical facility. His heroic and determined actions inspired all who observed him and were instrumental in saving the lives of eight fellow Marines. By his courage, superior aeronautical ability, and unfaltering devotion to duty in the face of grave personal danger, Lieutenant Colonel Brady upheld the highest traditions of the Marine Corps and of the United States Naval Service.
