= VMM-364 =

Marine Medium Tiltrotor Squadron 364
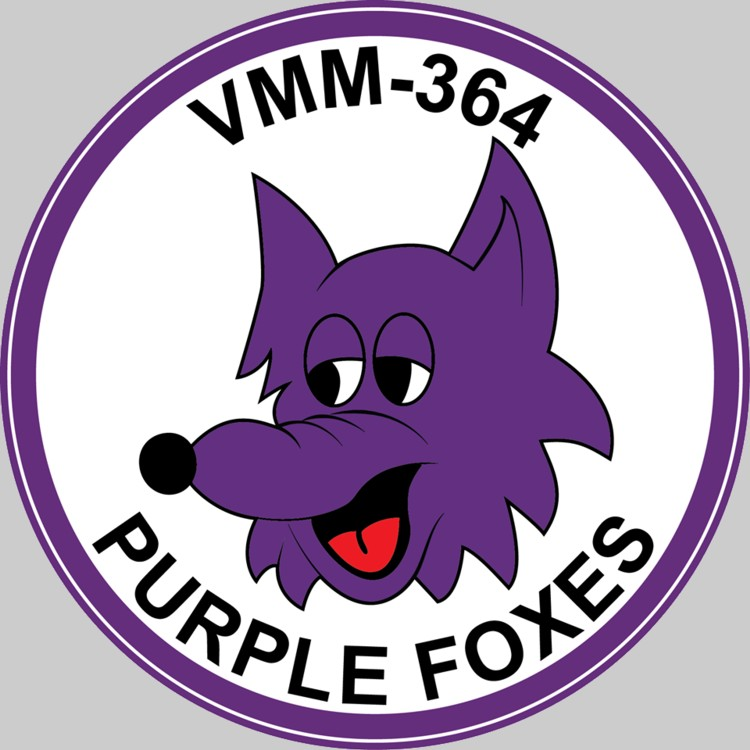
- Old HMM-364 Insignia
- Active: 1 September 1961 – 22 March 1971; 28 September 1984 – present
- Country: United States
- Allegiance: United States of America
- Branch: United States Marine Corps
- Type: Medium Lift Tiltrotor Squadron
- Role: Conduct air operations in support of the Fleet Marine Forces
- Part of: Marine Aircraft Group 39; 3rd Marine Aircraft Wing
- Garrison/HQ: Marine Corps Base Camp Pendleton
- Nickname: Purple Foxes
- Tail Code: PF
- Mascot: Swifty
- Engagements: Vietnam War Operation Iraqi Freedom: 2003 invasion of Iraq

Commanders
- Commanding Officer: LtCol. Jamie W. Bunce
- Sergeant Major: SgtMaj Luigi B. Morillas
- Notable commanders: Eugene R. Brady

Aircraft flown
- Cargo helicopter: CH-46 Sea Knight; MV-22B Osprey
- Utility helicopter: UH-34D Seahorse

Marine Medium Tiltrotor Squadron 364 (VMM-364) is a United States Marine Corps medium-lift tiltrotor squadron consisting of MV-22B Ospreys. The squadron, known as the "Purple Foxes", is based at Marine Corps Air Station Camp Pendleton, California and falls under the command of Marine Aircraft Group 39 (MAG-39) and the 3rd Marine Aircraft Wing (3rd MAW).

== Mission ==
Provide utility combat helicopter support to the landing force in the ship to shore movement and in subsequent operations ashore.

== History ==
=== Early years ===
Marine Medium Helicopter Squadron 364 was originally commissioned as Marine Helicopter Squadron 364 (HMR-364) on 1 September 1961 at Marine Corps Air Facility Santa Ana, California as part of Marine Aircraft Group 36 (MAG-36). In November 1961, it received its first Sikorsky UH-34 helicopter and in February 1962, the designation of the squadron was changed to Marine Medium Helicopter Squadron 364 (HMM-364).

The squadron supported the Operation Dominic nuclear tests in the mid-Pacific operating from USS Iwo Jima from 17 April to 10 August 1962 and from USS Princeton from 30 August to 14 November. The squadron conducted over water search and recovery of instrument capsules, personnel evacuations and ship to shore supply runs.

=== Vietnam War ===
In November 1963, the squadron deployed to Okinawa. On 1 February 1964 it relieved HMM-361 as the Operation Shufly squadron at Da Nang Air Base, South Vietnam. On its arrival the squadron began training Republic of Vietnam Air Force (RVNAF) crews to operate the UH-34 in preparation for forming their own squadrons. On 14 April a squadron UH-34D was shot down on a medevac mission 40 miles (64 km) west of Danang near the Laos border, the crew was rescued and the helicopter was destroyed. On 18 April the squadron supported Operation Lam Son 115 an Army of the Republic of Vietnam (ARVN) attack in the A Sầu Valley. From 27 April to 25 May the squadron supported Operation Quyet Thang 202 an ARVN attack on the Vietcong (VC) stronghold at Đỗ Xá (15.177°N 108.078°E). On 28 April a squadron UH-34 got caught in the rotor wash of another helicopter and crashed into a canal at Quảng Ngãi, the crew escaped but the helicopter was a total loss. On 30 April a squadron UH-34 was shot down while evacuating an ARVN patrol 42 miles (68 km) west of Danang with no losses. On 13 June a squadron UH-34 on a resupply mission from Khe Sanh to Tiger Tooth Mountain (Dong Voi Mẹp) (16.768°N 106.713°E) was caught in downdrafts and crashed, all crewmen were rescued but the helicopter was destroyed. On 16 June the squadron ceased operations and began preparing its UH-34Ds for handover to the RVNAF with the handover taking place on 19 June. By the end of June the squadron had been flown back to Okinawa and their role had been assumed by HMM-162.

In September 1965 the squadron returned to South Vietnam with the rest of MAG-36 and was based at Kỳ Hà. The squadron supported Operation Harvest Moon in December. During this time period the squadron adopted the "Purple Fox" name from a cartoon purple fox mascot called Swifty.

In March 1966 the squadron supported Operation Utah with the rest of MAG-36. On 9 April the squadron flew onboard USS Princeton replacing HMM-362 as the Special Landing Force (SLF) helicopter squadron. On 4 July HMM-363 relieved the squadron. The squadron left South Vietnam on 1 November. The squadron was then placed in cadre status at Marine Corps Air Station El Toro, California and consisted of three officers and 12 enlisted Marines.

In March 1967, the squadron was reorganized and began receiving the new Boeing CH-46D Sea Knight helicopters. On 28 October, most of the squadron's pilots and crews flew to South Vietnam where they began operating UH–34s to help relieve the medium lift shortage caused by the grounding of CH-46s while waiting for their own aircraft to be modified back in California. On 10 November the aircraft left the United States onboard the USS Valley Forge and 19 days later arrived at Phu Bai Combat Base.

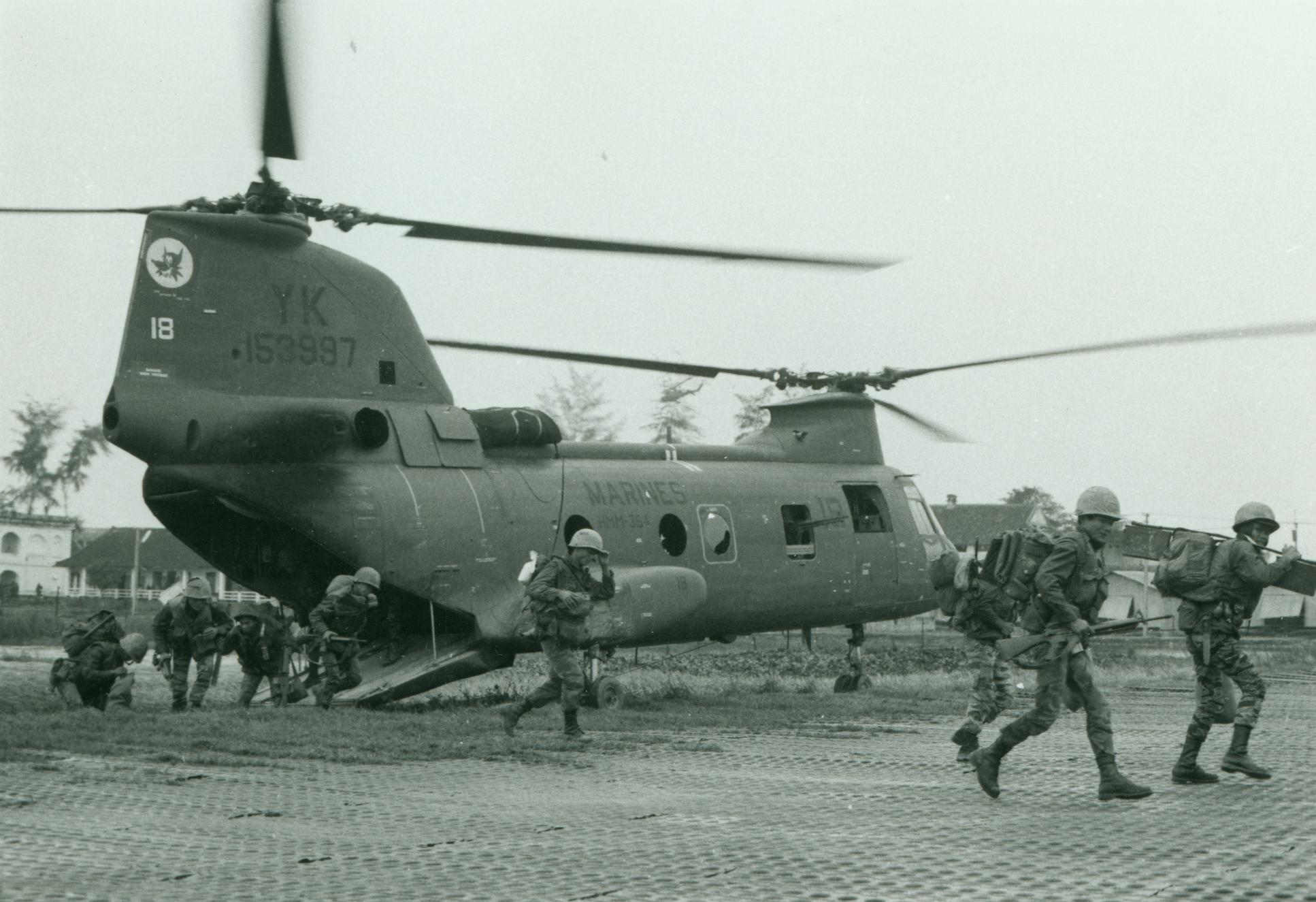
HMM-364 CH-46D lands South Vietnamese Marines during the Battle of Huế.

Throughout 1968 the squadron operated with the rest of MAG-36 from Phu Bai supporting Marine units in northern I Corps including in the Battle of Khe Sanh and Battle of Huế. In December 1968 the squadron supported Operation Taylor Common.

By the beginning of 1969 the squadron had been assigned to Marine Aircraft Group 16 (MAG-16) at Marble Mountain Air Facility.

On 16 February 1971 the squadron flew its last mission in South Vietnam and by the end of the month it had departed for the U.S.

For almost half of its short 10-year existence, HMM-364 served in South Vietnam. During its three tours there, the squadron's pilots and crewmen flew almost 70,000 hours in combat and combat support missions and the squadron was awarded the Presidential Unit Citation for meritorious conduct in the performance of duty. On 22 March 1971, the squadron folded its colors and was decommissioned.

=== The 1980s & 1990s ===
On 28 September 1984, HMM-364 was reactivated at Marine Aircraft Group 24, 1st Marine Brigade, Fleet Marine Force, Marine Corps Air Station Kaneohe Bay, Hawaii. On 12 October 1984, Commandant of the Marine Corps, Gen. P. X. Kelley, publicly reactivated the squadron by presenting the unit colors to the Commanding Officer.

In February 1990, the squadron deployed to Okinawa, Japan. From August 1990 to March 1991, HMM-364 was placed in reserve during Operation Desert Shield and Operation Desert Storm becoming the sole supporting squadron for 1st Marine Expeditionary Brigade.

In June 1991, the squadron once again deployed to Okinawa. During the deployment, the squadron supported Marine Air Ground Task Force 4-90 in the Republic of the Philippines before, during and after the eruption of Mount Pinatubo and resulting devastation. Continuing into 1992, the squadron would find themselves on Kauai, for Operation Garden Isle, performing humanitarian relief due to the devastation left by Hurricane Iniki.

From January through July 1993 the squadron deployed to Marine Corps Air Station Futenma, Okinawa as part of the Unit Deployment Program. During this period, squadron aircraft flew more than 2,200 mishap free hours while supporting Exercise Team Spirit in Pohang, South Korea, Joint Personnel Recovery Agency operations in Cambodia and Exercise Cobra Gold in Thailand.

In February 1996, the squadron provided executive transport for President Clinton and other dignitaries while they toured flood damaged Portland, Oregon. This marked the first time in history that a U.S. President had flown in a Fleet Marine Force helicopter.

On 5 December 1998, the squadron embarked aboard the USS Boxer participating in Operation Southern Watch and various split-ARG operations off the Horn of Africa.

In June 1999 the squadron returned from deployment and moved into their new home at Marine Aircraft Group 39 aboard Marine Corps Base Camp Pendleton, California. The squadron began training to their new core competency of being part of 3rd Marine Aircraft Wing's "Fly In" Echelon for contingency operations.

=== Global War on Terror ===
In 2003, HMM-364 was tasked with preparing for a possible deployment to Kuwait in support of the 1st Marine Expeditionary Force and Operation Iraqi Freedom.

By the end of February, the squadron was off loaded, and all twelve CH-46E helicopters flown to Ali Al Salem Air Base. In conjunction with MAG-39 and its augments, HMM-364 began mission planning and rehearsals for combat operations against Iraq.

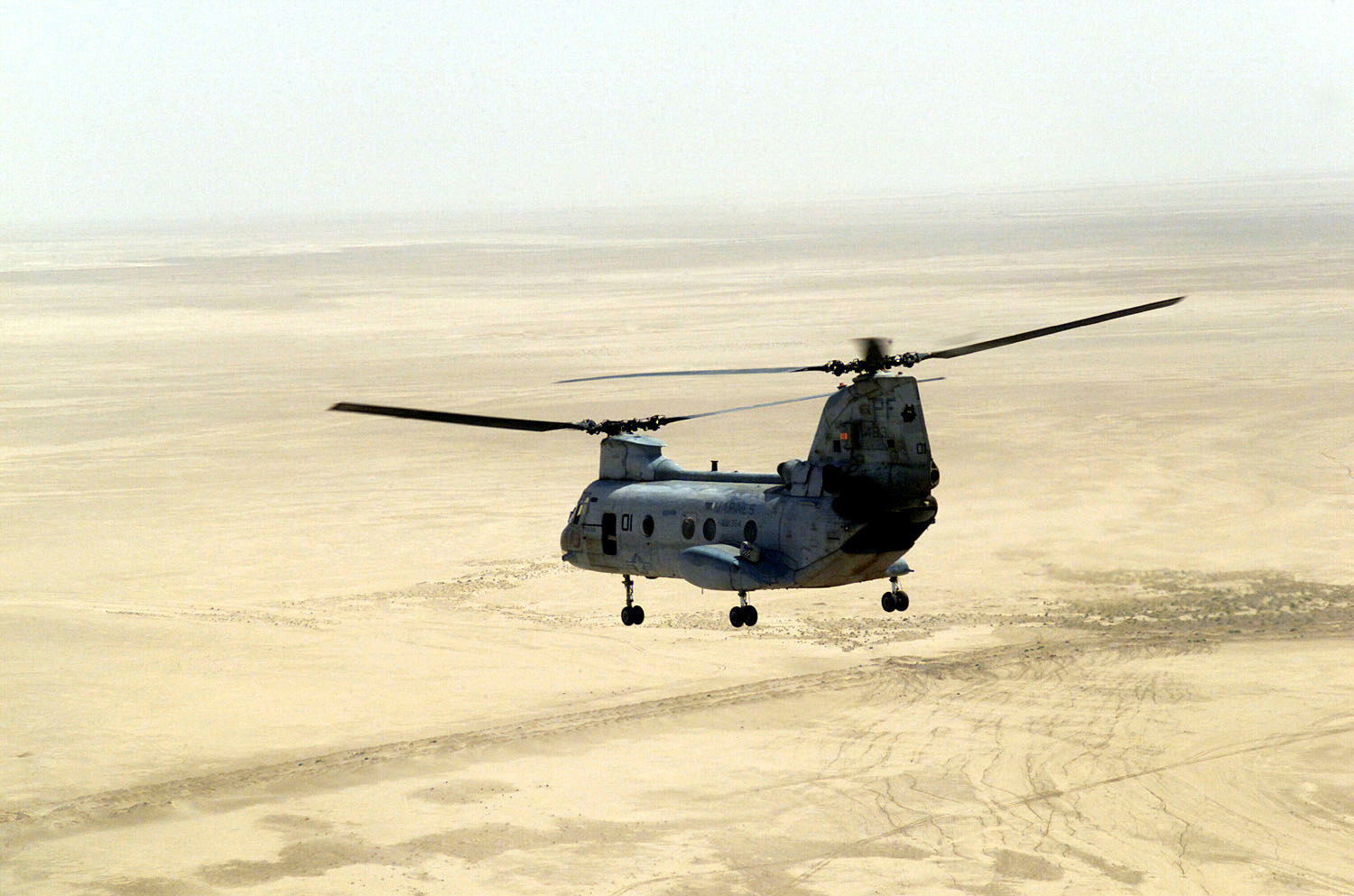
An HMM-364 CH-46 over southern Iraq in 2003

Operation Iraqi Freedom commenced on the evening of 20 March 2003, following preliminary strikes by coalition forces and Ground to Ground Missile attacks by Iraqi forces on Ali Al Salem Air Base. HMM-364 was involved from the first night, supporting attacks by the 1st Marine Division's Regimental Combat Team 7, as well as the Royal Marines's 42 Commando. Squadron aircrews conducted Casualty Evacuation (CASEVAC) missions in direct support of RCT-7 Headquarters for the duration of the war, traveling with the 1st Marine Division from Basra to downtown Baghdad. HMM-364 aircraft also flew Logistical Support throughout the theater, flying over 640 hours in combat and direct combat support per month for both March and April.

With the end of combat operations in Iraq on 17 April, HMM-364 continued to fly CASEVAC and Logistical Support for the Marine Corps humanitarian aid work underway on the behalf of the Iraqi people. HMM-364 returned to MCB Camp Pendleton in October 2003. During this deployment, one of the squadron's aircraft was lost during a resupply mission crashing into a canal. All four aircrew members were lost - Captain Andrew Lamont, First Lieutenant Timothy Ryan, Staff Sergeant Aaron White, Lance Corporal Jason Moore and one Marine Sergeant Kirk Straseskie, who was not affiliated with the squadron, tragically drowned in his attempted rescue of the crew members. Several other Marines witnessing the down aircraft also leaped in the canal to attempt to rescue their fellow Marines. The hasty rescue was not successful and several rescuers suffered minor non-combat injuries.

The squadron deployed again to Iraq in the early months of 2005. Their third deployment to Iraq came in the summer of 2006 and they returned home in early 2007. During this deployment one of the squadron's aircraft was shot down during a CASEVAC mission resulting in the death of four squadron members, a Marine from another unit and two navy corpsmen.

The squadron's fourth deployment to Iraq occurred from early spring of 2008 until the fall of the same year.

The squadron's fifth and final deployment to Iraq came in late 2009. They returned safety in early 2010 having successfully completed their mission.

On 9 October 2014, HMM-364 transitioned to the MV-22B Osprey and thus was redesignated as VMM-364.

== Notable former members ==
- Eugene R. Brady
- Raymond M. Clausen, Jr.
- Roger E. Combs

== See also ==
- List of active United States Marine Corps aircraft squadrons
- United States Marine Corps Aviation
