= VMM-263 =

Marine Medium Tiltrotor Squadron-263
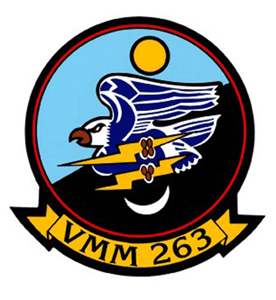
- Marine Medium Tiltrotor Squadron 263 Insignia
- Active: 16 June 1952 – present
- Country: United States
- Branch: United States Marine Corps
- Type: Medium-lift Tiltrotor Squadron
- Role: Conduct air operations in support of the Fleet Marine Forces
- Size: Approximately 250 marines
- Part of: Marine Aircraft Group 26; 2nd Marine Aircraft Wing
- Garrison/HQ: Marine Corps Air Station New River
- Nickname: "Thunder Chickens"
- Motto: Gopher Broke
- Tail Code: EG
- Mascot: Ready Ape
- Engagements: Vietnam War Operation Enduring Freedom - Horn of Africa Operation Iraqi Freedom

Commanders
- Current commander: LtCol Charles C. Randolph

Marine Medium Tiltrotor Squadron 263 (VMM-263) is a United States Marine Corps tiltrotor squadron consisting of MV-22B Osprey transport aircraft. The squadron, known as the "Thunder Chickens", is based at Marine Corps Air Station New River, North Carolina and falls under the command of Marine Aircraft Group 29 (MAG-29) and the 2nd Marine Aircraft Wing (2nd MAW).

== Early years ==
Marine Medium Tiltrotor Squadron 263 was activated initially as Marine Helicopter Transport Squadron (HMR-263) on 16 June 1952 and was outfitted with Sikorsky HRS helicopters. For its first two years of operations the squadron was based at Marine Corps Air Station Cherry Point, North Carolina. During these early months the squadron was occupied in proficiency training, which contributed to the growing body of knowledge of rotary wing aircraft and their employment and ultimately became the basis for the doctrine of vertical envelopment then being developed by the Marine Corps.

On 7 July 1954, HMR-263 relocated to Marine Corps Air Facility New River, North Carolina, where it remained home based for the next eleven years. During this time the squadron participated in over fifteen major exercises and deployments including disaster relief in Tampico, Mexico in October 1955 and operations from the submarine USS Sealion in March 1956. During December 1956 the squadron was redesignated HMR(L)-263. Six Caribbean deployments and numerous local training exercises ensued. During February 1962, the squadron was reequipped with the HUS-1 (UH-34) helicopter. In October 1962, HMM-263 was deployed to the Caribbean when the United States initiated a large-scale response to the Soviet Union’s deployment of intercontinental ballistic missiles to Cuba. In June 1964, the squadron was a participant in Exercise Steel Pike off the coast of Spain, then the largest amphibious exercise since World War II.

== Vietnam War ==
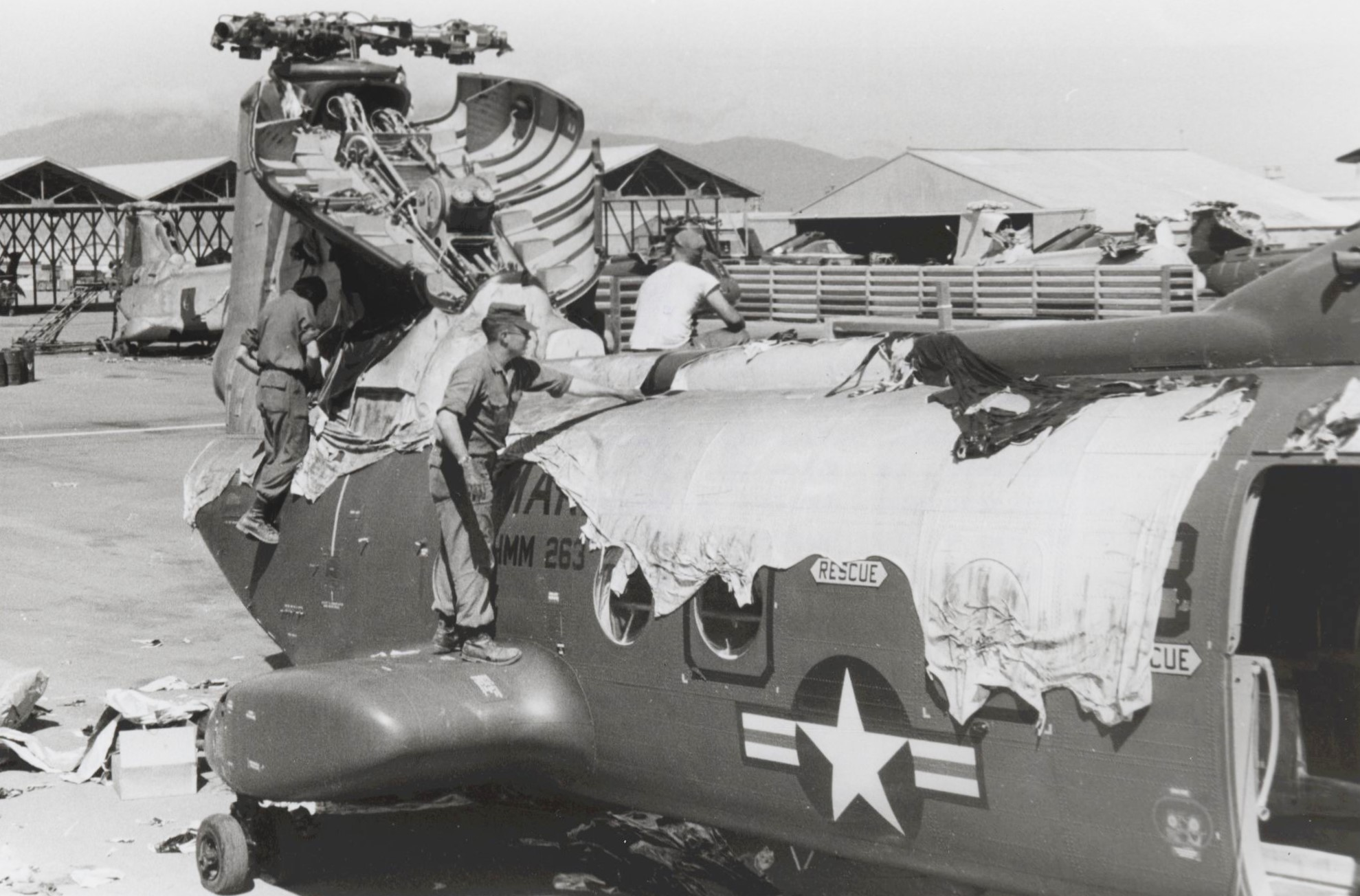
Protective covering is removed from an HMM-263 CH-46D at Marble Mountain Air Facility, January 1969

During April and May 1965, HMM-263 was deployed to the Dominican Republic in support of Operation Power Pack. On 23 August 1965, HMM-263 was transferred to Marine Corps Air Station Futenma and placed under control of the 1st Marine Aircraft Wing (1st MAW). On 11 October 1965, the squadron moved from MCAS Futenma to Marble Mountain Air Facility, South Vietnam. For the next two years HMM-263 served in Vietnam participating in over twenty-four named combat operations.

During November 1967, HMM-263 was transferred to Marine Corps Air Station Santa Ana, California where it was re-equipped with CH-46D helicopters before redeploying to South Vietnam in January 1969.

Squadron member Raymond M. Clausen, Jr. was awarded the Medal of Honor for his actions on 31 January 1970.

On 18 November 1970 a squadron CH-46D crashed into terrain in the Quế Sơn District after extracting a Marine patrol killing all 15 onboard. Among those killed was Lieutenant Colonel William G. Leftwich Jr. commander of the 1st Reconnaissance Battalion.

The squadron remained in Vietnam until April 1971 and then transferred to Marine Corps Air Station Quantico, Virginia and began flying the CH-46F helicopter. HMM-263 remained home based at Quantico for four years and participated in several cold weather exercises, two Mediterranean cruises, and one Caribbean deployment in addition to numerous smaller training exercises.

== 1970s & 1980s ==
During August 1975, HMM-263 relocated to Marine Corps Air Station New River, North Carolina. While home based at New River, the squadron completed the transition to the CH-46E helicopter over the summer of 1980. For the next seventeen years the squadron deployed in four major NATO exercises, made six Mediterranean cruises, and deployed on goodwill cruises to Africa, South America and the Caribbean. During the squadron's 1984 deployment, it served with the Commander Joint Task Force Lebanon in support of Marine Security Forces ashore in Beirut. The squadron first served in Lebanon from October 1982 until March 1983, then again from April 1984 until August 1984.

During their 1986 deployment the squadron served as the Aviation Combat Element (ACE) of the 26th Marine Amphibious Unit (26th MAU), which operated in support of Combined Task Force 60 (CTF-60) during operations in Libya. HMM-263 deployed in May 1987, under command of Lt. Colonel J.R. Pruden, as the ACE for the 24th Marine Amphibious Unit (24th MAU). During this time contingency operations in the Persian Gulf necessitated splitting the squadron into three sections, operating from the United States, the Mediterranean Sea and the Persian Gulf. While deployed, squadron aircraft participated in the seizure of the Iranian mine laying ship "Iran Ajar".

== The Gulf War & the 1990s ==
In August 1990 the squadron again found itself headed for the Persian Gulf region. As a part of the 4th Marine Expeditionary Brigade (4th MEB), the squadron’s aircraft flew countless hours in support of the amphibious task force, participated in numerous amphibious assault exercises, and conducted a non-combatant evacuation operation of the U.S. Embassy in Mogadishu, Somalia (Operation Eastern Exit). The squadron also assisted in the interdiction of two Iraqi vessels in support of the United Nations mandated embargo of Iraq.

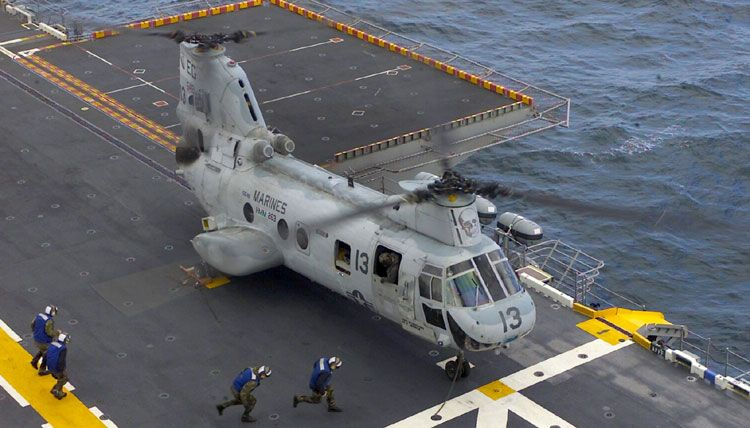
Sailors from USS Saipan rush out to unchain a CH-46 in 2004.

In March 1993 the squadron was called upon to support United States Central Command (USCENTCOM) deployment to Somalia participating in Operation Restore Hope and Operation Continue Hope.

In 1995, the squadron deployed aboard USS Kearsarge (LHD-3) as the Aviation Combat Element (ACE) for the 24th MEU(SOC). During this deployment the squadron participated in six large scale, multinational exercises while providing Tactical Recovery of Aircraft and Personnel (TRAP) support for NATO Operation Deny Flight and Operation Provide Promise in the Adriatic Sea. The squadron also conducted the successful TRAP rescue mission of Air Force pilot Captain Scott O'Grady on 8 June 1995. In July 1996 the squadron was selected as the Marine Corps Aviation Association’s "Marine Medium Helicopter Squadron of the Year."

In 1997, HMM-263 went on another deployment providing a U.S. presence in the Mediterranean Sea and Black Sea, as well as participating in Operation Joint Guard in the Adriatic Sea, and Operation Southern Watch in the Persian Gulf.

== Global War on Terror ==
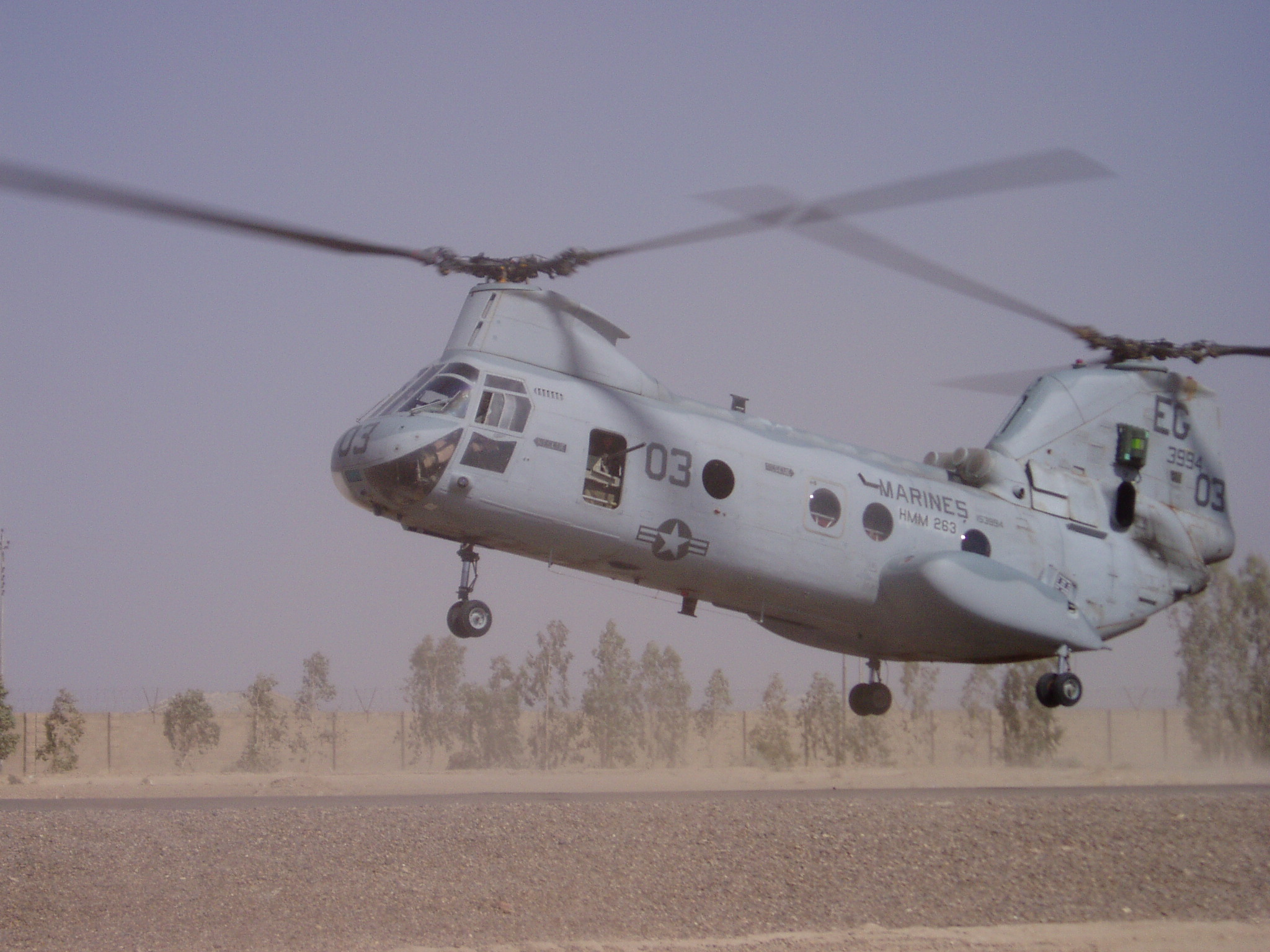
HMM-263 CH-46 landing at Camp Fallujah in July 2004

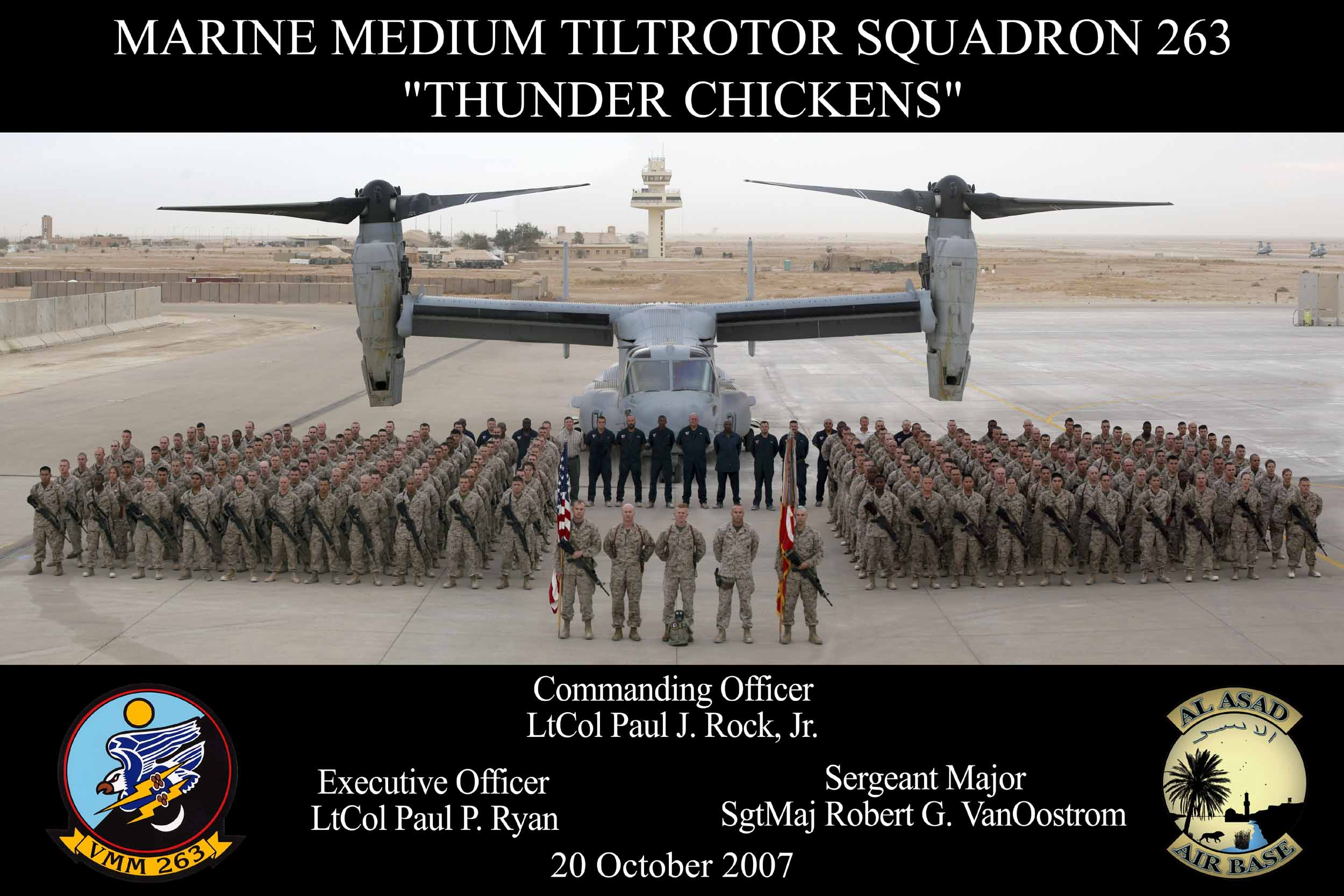
Squadron poster from current Operation Iraqi Freedom deployment at Al Asad Air Base, Iraq.

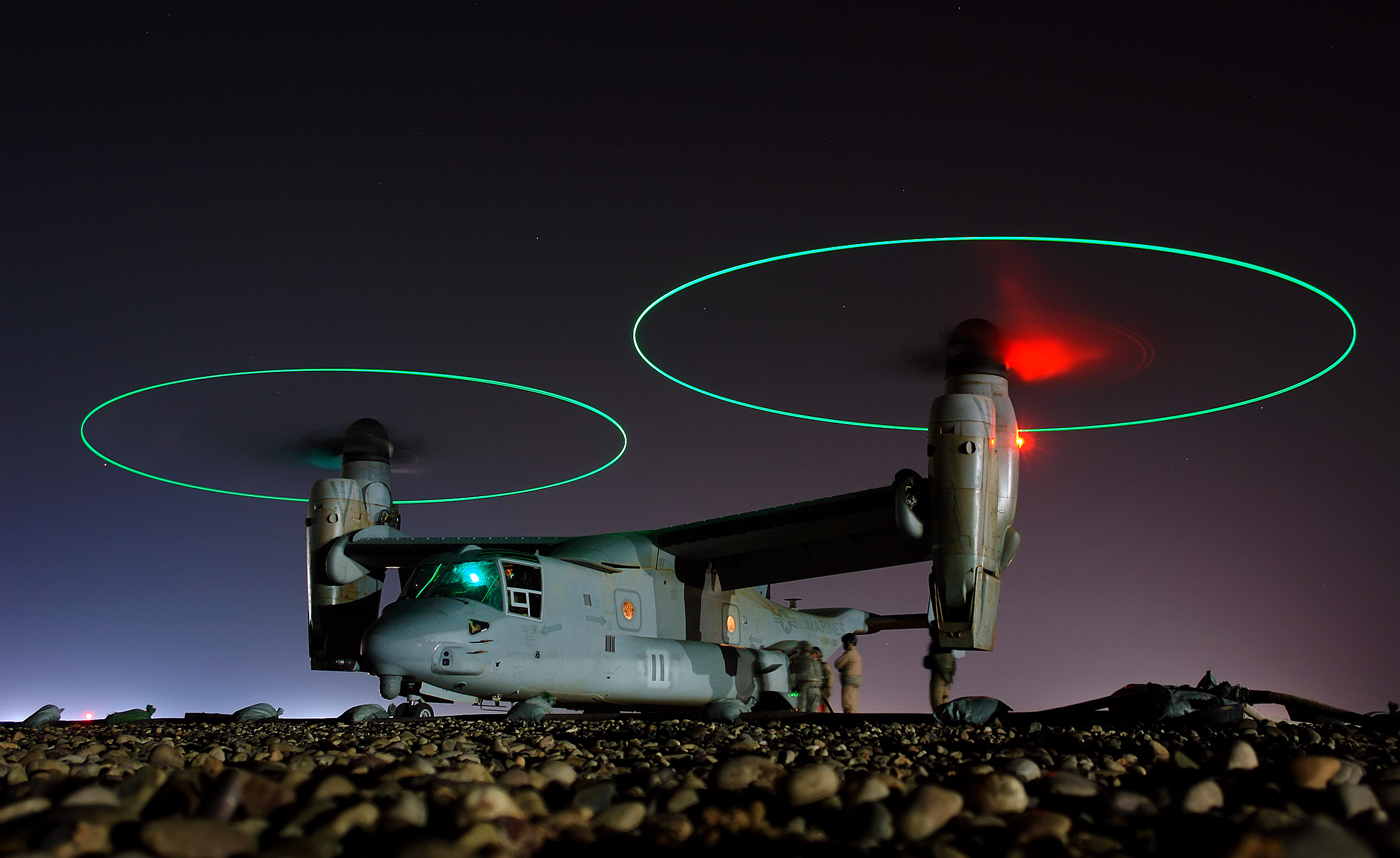
An MV-22 from VMM-263 refueling at night in Iraq.

During the nine-month deployment as part of the 24th MEU in 2002-2003, the Thunder Chickens, as they were then known, flew an unprecedented 9568 hours and participated in Operation Enduring Freedom in the Horn of Africa, and Operation Iraqi Freedom in and around Baghdad, Tikrit, and Al Kut, Iraq.

In June and July, 2004 HMM-263 (Rein) was deployed to Al Taqqadum, Iraq. They once again engaged in support of combat operations. While participating in operations such as Second Battle of Fallujah, Citadel II, Riverwalk, and Plymouth Rock, HMM-263 (Rein) totaled 7,472.5 combat flight hours, of which an amazing 4,664.9 were on NVG’s. During this tour, the squadron executed the first all-Iraqi heliborne assault in support of the newly created Iraqi Security Forces. The squadron re-deployed in February 2005 with only seven CH-46E’s in anticipation of the transition to the MV-22.

The squadron was officially stood down June 3, 2005, for transitioning from the CH-46 Sea Knight to the MV-22 Osprey. HMM-263 was re-designated VMM-263 and reactivated March 3, 2006 as the first operational MV-22 squadron.

On 17 September 2007, VMM-263 left with 10 Ospreys from MCAS New River for Iraq aboard the amphibious assault ship USS Wasp (LHD-1). The squadron is currently training to become the first MV-22 squadron to support a Marine Expeditionary Unit. They will be part of the 22nd Marine Expeditionary Unit and are due to float in the spring of 2009.

== Unit awards ==
A unit citation or commendation is an award bestowed upon an organization for the action cited. Members of the unit who participated in said actions are allowed to wear on their uniforms the awarded unit citation. VMM-263 has been presented with the following awards:

Ribbon	Unit Award
	Presidential Unit Citation with two Bronze Stars
	Joint Meritorious Unit Award
	Navy Unit Commendation with one Silver Star and Bronze Star
	Meritorious Unit Commendation with four Bronze Stars

== Notable former members ==
- Roger E. Combs
- Robert Magnus

== See also ==
- List of active United States Marine Corps aircraft squadrons
- United States Marine Corps Aviation
