= Joseph J. McCarthy =

United States Marine Corps Medal of Honor recipient (1911–1966)

Joseph Jeremiah McCarthy
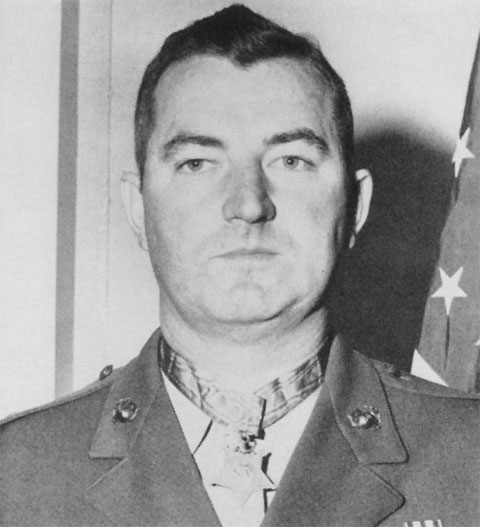
- Joseph J. McCarthy
- Born: August 10, 1911; Chicago, Illinois
- Died: June 15, 1996 (aged 84); Palm Beach, Florida
- Burial place: Arlington National Cemetery
- Military career
- Allegiance: United States of America
- Branch: United States Marine Corps
- Service years: 1937–1941, 1942–1971
- Rank: Lieutenant colonel
- Unit: 2nd Battalion 24th Marines
- Conflicts: World War II; Battle of Roi-Namur; Battle of Saipan; Battle of Tinian; Battle of Iwo Jima
- Awards: Medal of Honor; Silver Star; Purple Heart (x2)
- Other work: Chief, Chicago Fire Department

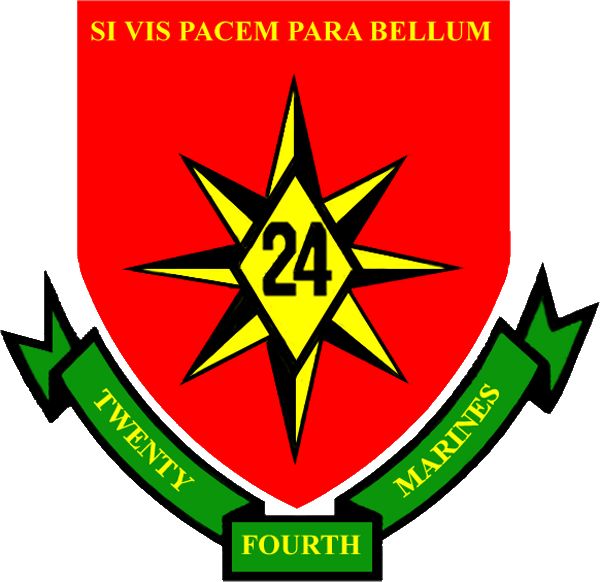

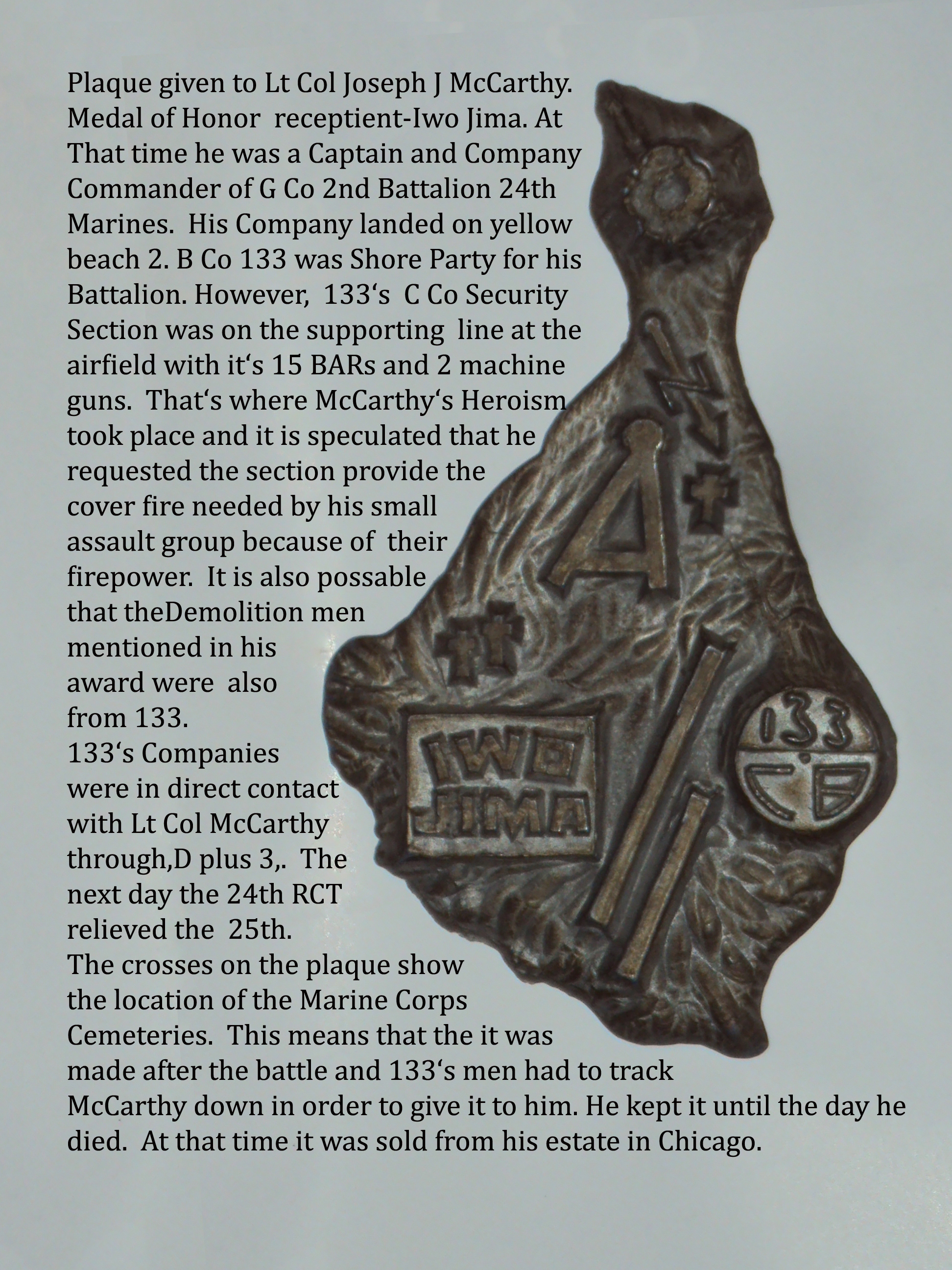
133rd Naval Construction Battalion Plaque from the estate of Lt.Col Joseph J. McCarthy...Fig. 1

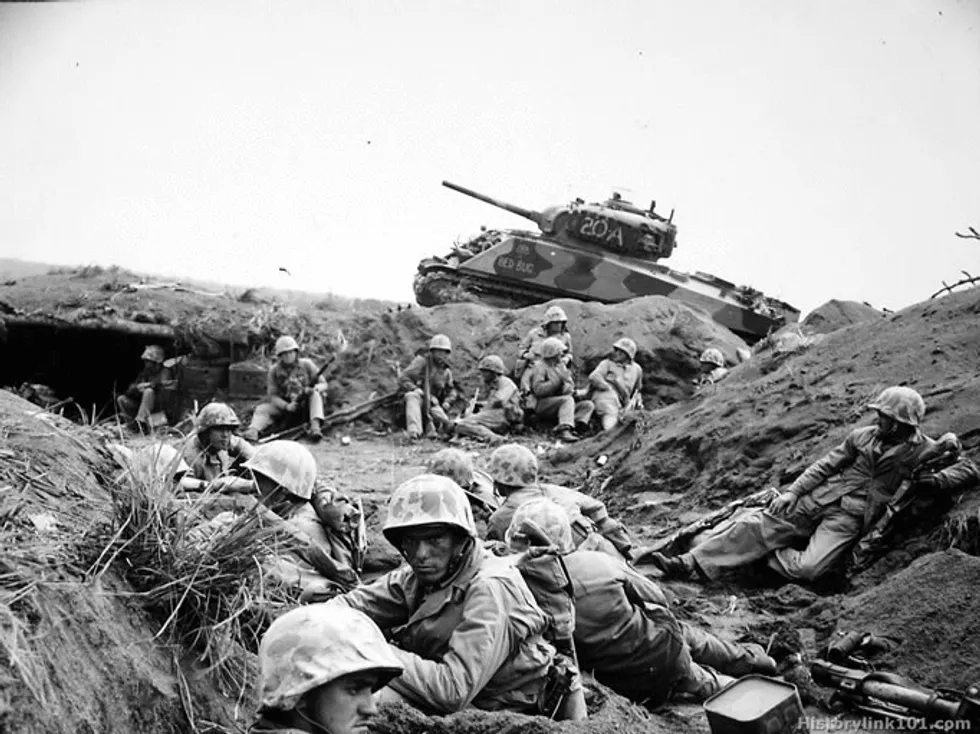
USMC photo 109666, G Company 2nd Battalion 24th Marines

Joseph Jeremiah McCarthy (August 10, 1911 – June 15, 1996) was a mustang officer in the United States Marine Corps Reserve, who served during World War II and the Korean War. He was also the Superintendent of Ambulances in the Chicago Fire Department; however, with respect for his wartime heroics, firefighters continued to address him by his wartime military rank of "Captain."

== Marine Corps Service ==
McCarthy was thirty-three; overage for a company commander. He was Irish and he looked it: husky, red complexioned, pug nose. Superior officers sometimes found his manner abrasive, but unlike many Irishmen, he wasn't talkative. He was, in fact, laconic and tight-lipped. "I don't like malarkey or bullshit," the Chicagoan often said. But Joe McCarthy knew the uncompromising business of battle; he had the Silver Star for leading his company up a savagely contested hill on Saipan, and his men called him "the best damned officer in the Marine Corps."

— Bill D. Ross (1985), Historian, Iwo Jima: Legacy of Valor. Pages 146–147. New York: Vanguard Press, 1985. Print.

On February 20, 1937, McCarthy first enlisted in the Marine Corps in Chicago, and served for four years. He re-enlisted following the attack on Pearl Harbor, and returned to active duty in February 1942. In June of that year, he was discharged with the rank of first sergeant, in order to accept a commission in the Marine Corps Reserve.

McCarthy joined the 4th Marine Division shortly thereafter, and went overseas in January 1944. While deployed, he took part in the Roi-Namur, Saipan-Tinian, and Iwo Jima campaigns. In 1944, he was awarded the Silver Star for heroism as a rifle company commander on Saipan. He received the Purple Heart with Gold Star for wounds received in action on Saipan and Iwo Jima.

On Iwo Jima, McCarthy was the company commander of G Co. 2nd Battalion 24th Marines. He landed on yellow beach 2 alongside the 23rd Marines. On D plus 3, the 24th RCT relieved the 25th. His battalion moved, and was supported by the blue beaches. On February 21, 1945, as a captain, he earned the Medal of Honor, while leading an assault team across exposed ground to wipe out positions holding up the advance of his company at airfield No. 2. It is believed that a Seabee heavy weapons platoon provided the fire support he needed that day. (Fig. 1) On October 5, 1945, President Harry S. Truman presented the Medal of Honor to McCarthy in ceremonies at the White House.

Released from active duty following the war, he continued to serve in the Marine Corps Reserve, and was eventually promoted to the grade of lieutenant colonel.

"I would hope and pray there never be another Medal of Honor issued," McCarthy remarked in a 1992 interview. "I hope and pray there's never any more wars."

== After the War ==
In 1949, McCarthy drove from Maine to North Carolina in order to visit the families of twenty-six Marines that had been killed on Iwo Jima. He told each family that their man had been just as brave as he was, just not as lucky. After the war, McCarthy moved to the Near West Side, residing at 720 West Vernon Park Place for a time.

McCarthy was the grand marshal of the City of Chicago's Saint Patrick's Day Parade in 1959.

McCarthy retired from the Marine Corps Reserve in 1971, and from the Chicago Fire Department in 1973. Thereafter, he and his wife split their time between their homes in Wisconsin and Delray Beach, Florida. His wife, Anita, died in 1978. The couple had no children.

The building that houses the Headquarters of the 2nd Battalion 24th Marines in Chicago is named in his honor. Lt. Col. McCarthy was buried at Arlington National Cemetery following a funeral mass at Holy Name Cathedral in Chicago.

== Citations ==
=== Medal of Honor citation ===
The President of the United States in the name of The Congress takes pride in presenting the MEDAL OF HONOR to:

CAPTAIN JOSEPH J. McCARTHY
UNITED STATES MARINE CORPS RESERVE

for service as set forth in the following CITATION:

For conspicuous gallantry and intrepidity at the risk of his life above and beyond the call of duty as commanding officer of a rifle company attached to the 2nd Battalion 24th Marines|, 4th Marine Division, in action against enemy Japanese forces during the seizure of Iwo Jima, Volcano Islands, on 21 February 1945. Determined to break through the enemy's cross-island defenses, Capt. McCarthy acted on his own initiative when his company advance was held up by uninterrupted Japanese rifle, machine gun, and high-velocity 47mm. fire during the approach to Motoyama Airfield No. 2. Quickly organizing a demolitions and flamethrower team to accompany his picked rifle squad, he fearlessly led the way across 75 yards of fire-swept ground, charged a heavily fortified pillbox on the ridge of the front, and, personally hurling hand grenades into the emplacement as he directed the combined operations of his small assault group, completely destroyed the hostile installation. Spotting two Japanese soldiers attempting an escape from the shattered pillbox, he boldly stood upright in full view of the enemy, and dispatched both troops before advancing to a second emplacement under greatly intensified fire, and then blasted the strong fortifications with a well-planned demolitions attack. Subsequently entering the ruins, he found a Japanese taking aim at one of our men, and, with alert presence of mind, jumped the enemy, disarmed, and shot him with his own weapon. Then, intent on smashing through the narrow breach, he rallied the remainder of his company, and pressed a full attack with furious aggressiveness, until he had neutralized all resistance and captured the ridge. An inspiring leader and indomitable fighter, Capt. McCarthy consistently disregarded all personal danger during the fierce conflict, and, by his brilliant professional skill, daring tactics, and tenacious perseverance in the face of overwhelming odds, contributed materially to the success of his division's operations against this savagely defended outpost of the Japanese Empire. His cool decision and outstanding valor reflect the highest credit upon Capt. McCarthy, and enhance the finest traditions of the U.S. Naval Service.

=== Silver Star citation ===
Citation:

The President of the United States of America takes pleasure in presenting the Silver Star to Captain Joseph Jeremiah McCarthy (MCSN: 0-11098), United States Marine Corps Reserve, for conspicuous gallantry and intrepidity as Commanding Officer of Company G, Second Battalion, Twenty-fourth Marines, FOURTH Marine Division, in action against enemy Japanese forces on Saipan, Marianas Islands, 4 July 1944. With his company in a defensive position and receiving intense and accurate enemy rifle and machine-gun fire, Captain McCarthy gallantly left cover to answer the cries of the wounded after two hospital corpsmen had been shot in quick succession while attempting to aid a wounded officer. Finding one of the men still alive, he attempted to remove him to safety, despite the withering enemy fire, but during this endeavor, the wounded man was shot through the head, and died in Captain McCarthy's arms. His outstanding courage, unselfish efforts, and gallant devotion to duty were in keeping with the highest traditions of the United States Naval Service.

== Awards and decorations ==

1st row	Medal of Honor	Silver Star	Purple Heart with 1 5/16 inch star
2nd row	Combat Action Ribbon	Presidential Unit Citation with 1 Service star	Selected Marine Corps Reserve Medal with 1 Service star
3rd row	American Defense Service Medal	American Campaign Medal	Asiatic-Pacific Campaign Medal with 4 Campaign stars
4th row	World War II Victory Medal	National Defense Service Medal with 1 Service star	Marine Corps Reserve Ribbon with 1 Service star

== Of note ==
- His military record lists his year of birth as 1911, but it is inscribed as 1912 on his headstone.

== See also ==
- List of Medal of Honor recipients
- List of Medal of Honor recipients for World War II
- List of Medal of Honor recipients for the Battle of Iwo Jima
- Battle of Iwo Jima
- 2nd Battalion 24th Marines
- Naval Mobile Construction Battalion 133
