= Operation Plymouth Rock =

2004 anti-insurgent sweep of an area south of Baghdad

- Part of Iraq war
Date	23 November 2004
Location	Baghdad, Iraq
Result	captured 32 suspected insurgents

Belligerents
(United States) U.S. Marine Corps; New Iraqi Army (United Kingdom) British Army	Iraqi insurgency

Units involved
(United States) 24th Marine Expeditionary Unit (United Kingdom) Black watch (Iraq) Iraqi Security forces	Unknown

Strength
5000 in total	Unknown

Casualties and losses
None	32 Insurgents captured

Operation Plymouth Rock was a major anti-insurgent sweep of an area south of Baghdad launched on 23 November 2004. Iraqi, American and British troops took part. Elements of the American 24th Marine Expeditionary Unit and the British Black Watch Regiment took part.

== History ==
Iraqi Security Forces, backed by elements of the 24th Marine Expeditionary Unit, increased operations on 23 November 2004 in the south-central Iraqi town of Jabella. Operations, which started earlier in November, continued the campaign in the northern Babil province aimed at rooting out insurgent forces.

The combined Iraqi-U.S. force captured 32 suspected insurgents, including a number of high-interest individuals, in a series of early-morning raids approximately 50 miles south of Baghdad. Jabella is among several cities and towns in the province that the Interim Iraqi Government, supported by the Multi-National Forces, are determined to return to the Iraqi people.

Ongoing operations in the North Babil province involved more than 5,000 Iraqi, U.S. and British forces.

As Iraqi Security Forces and their U.S. partners began liberating Fallujah earlier this month, insurgent activity intensified in northern Babil. Insurgent attacks rose in an apparent effort to divert attention from the high-profile battle west of Baghdad.

Iraqi forces and Marines have maintained their own pressure, rounding up insurgents in daily raids, house-to-house searches and random vehicle checkpoints. They've been aided by a British armored battle group—the 1st Battalion of the Black Watch Regiment.

Through the combined operations, ISF and Multi-National Forces continue to make steady gains in the campaign to restore security and stability to Iraq as the Iraqi people prepare to vote in nationwide elections in January.

It followed the many operations including the most intense combat since Vietnam. The closest that the 2nd Operation in Fallujah Operation Phantom Fury can be related to is "Hue City" during the Tet Offensive.

== See also ==
- Fallujah during the Iraq War
