= Leland Kirkemo =

United States Navy captain

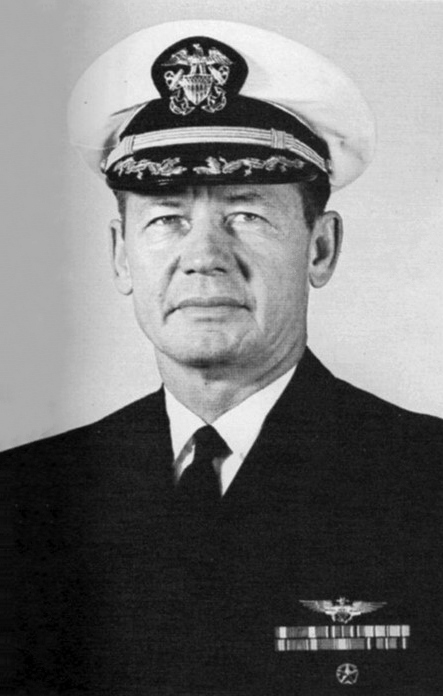
- Born: 28 May 1920; Wahena Township, Cass County, Minnesota, US
- Died: 23 September 2010 (aged 90); Oak Harbor, Washington, US
- Burial place: Tahoma National Cemetery, King County, Washington, US
- Spouse: Louise Liermann (m. 1946)
- Children: 3
- Military career
- Allegiance: United States
- Branch: United States Navy
- Service years: 1942–1975
- Rank: Captain
- Commands: USS Iwo Jima; USS Haleakala; VAH-123
- Conflicts: World War II; Korean War; Vietnam War

Leland Erwin Kirkemo (28 May 1920 – 23 September 2010) was a United States Navy captain. As the skipper of the amphibious assault ship USS Iwo Jima in 1970, he was responsible for the recovery of the Apollo 13 spacecraft and crew.

== Early life ==
Leland Erwin Kirkemo was born in Wahena Township, Cass County, Minnesota, on 28 May 1920, the son of Thorleif Kirkemo and his wife Lena (née Lone). His father was an immigrant from Norway who had arrived in the United States in 1903 with his family. Kirkemo grew up in Itasca County, Minnesota, where his father was a mailman and his mother was a schoolteacher who taught at the small, one-room local school. He went to Deer River High School, from which he graduated in 1936. Work was hard to find during the Great Depression, and he found employment with the Civilian Conservation Corps, a relief program run by the federal government.

== Naval career ==
In February 1942, not long after the United States entered World War II, Kirkemo enlisted in the United States Navy. He was initially trained as a radio operator, but was then selected for flight training in Jacksonville, Florida. He was commissioned as an ensign and became a naval aviator in 1944. He served with VPB-197, VPB-102 and VPHL-106. During a furlough to visit his parents in Minnesota, he met Louise Faye Liermann, an Army nurse. Louise later served in the Philippines and in Japan on the staff of General of the Army Douglas MacArthur. After the war ended, Kirkemo decided to remain in the Navy, and to marry Louise. They were married in Knapp, Dunn County, Wisconsin, on 25 August 1946. They had a daughter and two sons.

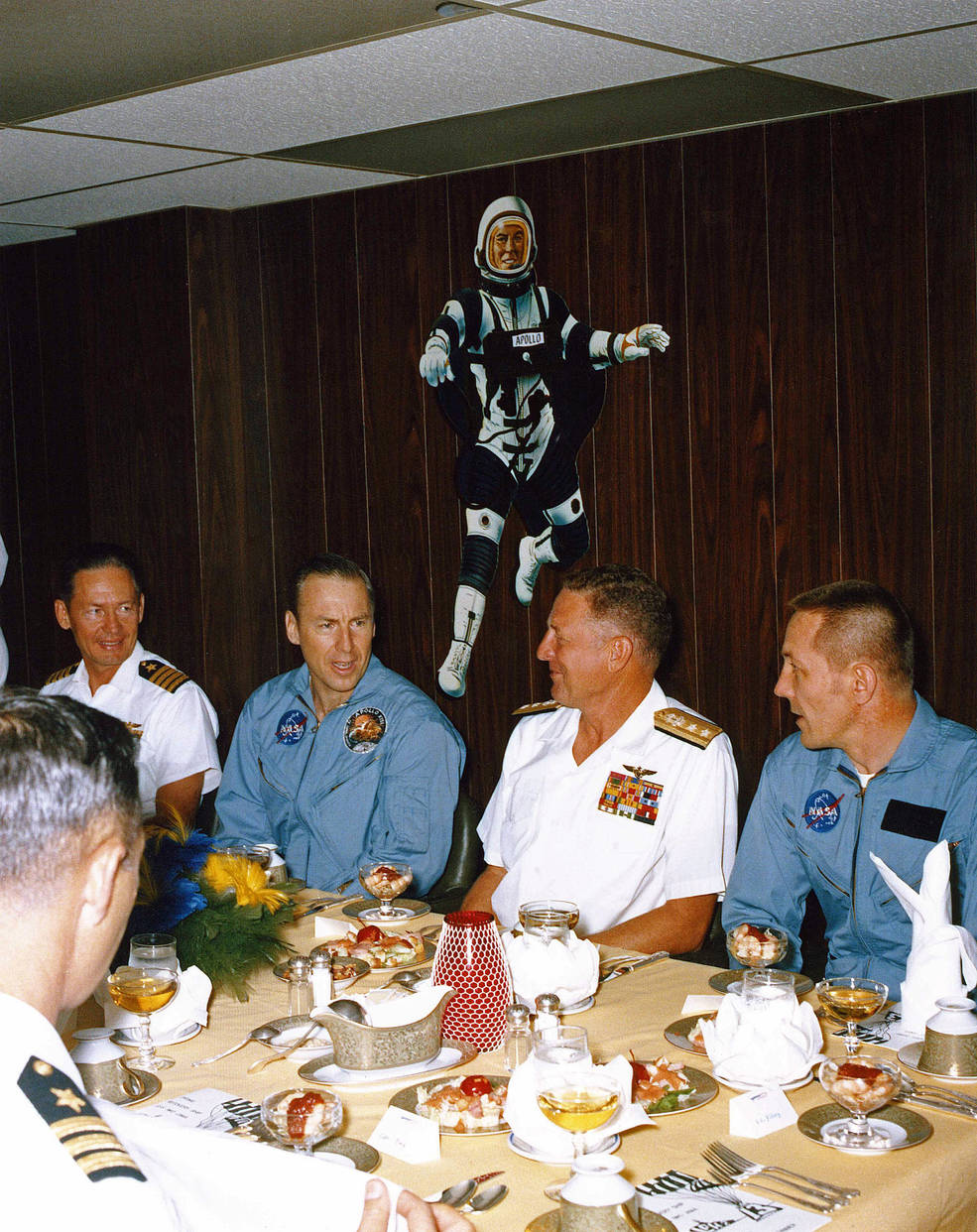
Kirkemo (left) with (left to right) Apollo 13 astronaut Jim Lovell, Rear Admiral Donald C. Davis and astronaut Jack Swigert on board the USS Iwo Jima

Kirkemo graduated from the University of Minnesota with an associate degree in liberal arts in March 1949. He attended the Navy General Line School in Monterey, California, and was posted to a heavy attack squadron at NAS Moffett Field in California that trained to deliver nuclear weapons. He served with the Heavy Attack Squadron 7 (VAH-7) at Sandia Base in New Mexico and on the staff of Heavy Attack Wing One in Norfolk, Virginia.

In 1954 he went to the Naval Ordnance Test Station, where he was involved in the development of the SM-65 Atlas missile. After this, he attended the Air Command and Staff College at Maxwell Air Force Base in Alabama. This was followed by duty as a training officer with Heavy Attack Wing and as operations officer with Heavy Attack Squadron 2 (RVAH-2). He served with this squadron on two tours of the Western Pacific on the aircraft carrier USS Coral Sea, flying the Douglas A-3 Skywarrior. The squadron won the Navy "E" and the Chief of Naval Operations (CNO) Safety Award.

This was followed by duty ashore on the staff of the Commander in Chief, United States Pacific Command (CinCPAC), and Kirkemo was the CinCPAC representative on the Joint Strategic Planning Staff at Offutt Air Force Base in Omaha, Nebraska. He became a graduate of the University of Omaha. He returned to the Pacific Fleet in January 1964 as commander of VAH-123. He then became the operations officer on the aircraft carrier USS Constellation. In March 1966, he joined the staff of the Strategic Plans Division (OP-60) in the office of the CNO in Washington, DC.

From September 1968 to November 1969, Kirkemo was the commanding officer of the ammunition ship USS Haleakala. The Haleakala served off the coast of Vietnam, where it resupplied ships including the battleship USS New Jersey. He then assumed command of the amphibious assault ship USS Iwo Jima. As such, he was responsible for the recovery of the Apollo 13 spacecraft and crew. When the story of Apollo 13 was made into a film, Apollo 13 (1995), the real Jim Lovell, the skipper of Apollo 13, had a cameo scene as Kirkemo, saluting and shaking hands with "Jim Lovell" (played by Tom Hanks).

== Later life ==
In his last assignment, as chief of staff of the Naval Air Station Whidbey Island, Kirkemo lived in Oak Harbor, Washington. He and his wife liked the area so much that after he retired from the Navy in July 1975, they elected to stay there. He was a member of the Oak Harbor Rotary Club, and he served as its president from 1983 to 1984. He was also involved in the Navy League, the Deception Pass Power Squadron, and the Oak Harbor Yacht Club. He died on 23 September 2010 after a long battle with Parkinson's disease, and was buried in Tahoma National Cemetery in King County, Washington.
