= USS Iwo Jima (LPH-2) =

U.S. Navy amphibious assault ship

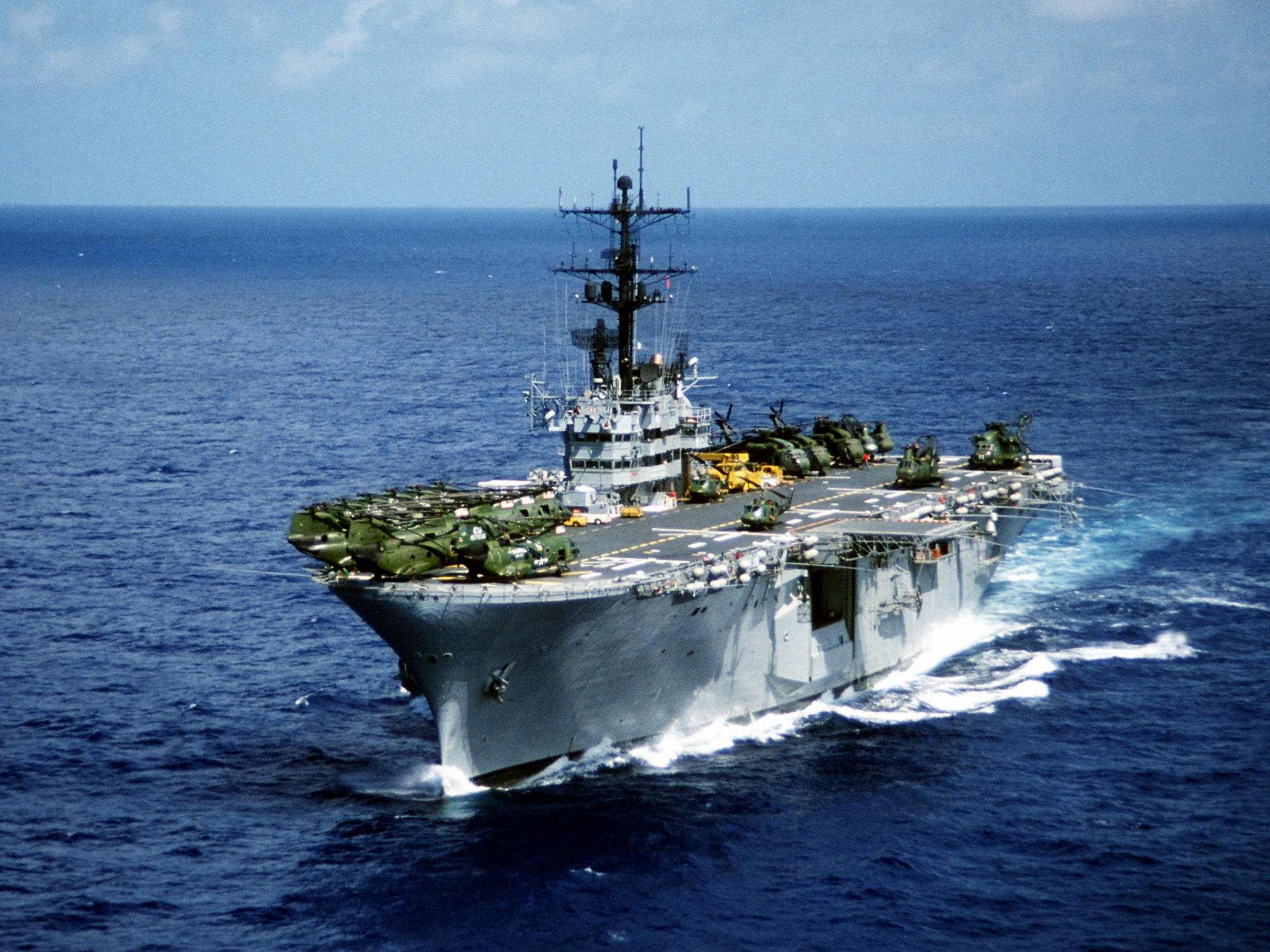
- USS Iwo Jima off the United States East Coast in April 1979

History

United States
- Name: Iwo Jima
- Namesake: Battle of Iwo Jima
- Builder: Puget Sound Naval Shipyard
- Laid down: 2 April 1959
- Launched: 17 September 1960
- Commissioned: 26 August 1961
- Decommissioned: 14 July 1993
- Stricken: 24 September 1993
- Identification: Callsign: NXXG; Hull number: LPH-2
- Fate: Scrapped, 18 December 1995

General characteristics
- Class & type: Iwo Jima-class amphibious assault ship
- Displacement: 18,474 tons (full); 11,000 tons (light)
- Length: 592 ft (180 m)
- Beam: 84 ft (26 m)
- Draught: 27 ft (8.2 m)
- Propulsion: 2 × 600 psi (4.1 MPa) boilers, one geared steam turbine, one shaft, 22,000 shaft horsepower; (16 MW)
- Speed: 22 knots (41 km/h)
- Range: 11,118km (6,000nm) at 18 knots
- Troops: 2,000
- Complement: 667
- Armament: Initially: 2 × 2 3-inch (76 mm) / 50 caliber DP guns, 8 cell Sea Sparrow BPDMS launchers, Later: 2 × Phalanx CIWS
- Aircraft carried: 25 helicopters

USS Iwo Jima (LPH-2) was the lead ship of her class and type and the first amphibious assault ship to be designed and built from the keel up as a dedicated helicopter carrier. She carried helicopters and typically embarked the Aviation Combat Element (ACE) of a USMC Marine Expeditionary Unit (MEU) (previously the Marine Amphibious Unit, or MAU) to conduct heliborne operations in support of amphibious operations. There was no well deck to dock landing craft to enable transport of personnel or equipment to/from shore. Iwo Jima was the second of three ships of the United States Navy to be named for the Battle of Iwo Jima, although it was the first to be completed and see service (the first was cancelled during construction).

== First cruises and Cuban Missile Crisis ==
Iwo Jima was laid down on 2 April 1959 by Puget Sound Naval Shipyard, launched on 17 September 1960, sponsored by Mrs. Harry Schmidt, and commissioned on 26 August 1961.

Following shakedown training, she spent the rest of 1961 off the California coast in amphibious exercises. In April 1962, the ship joined Joint Task Force 8 in the Johnston Island-Hawaii area for Operation Dominic, a series of nuclear tests. Iwo Jima evacuated several islands and took part in the test evaluation. On 26 July, she sailed from the test area to Pearl Harbor, and continued on to San Diego, where she arrived on 10 August 1962.

In September, the ship took part in full-scale amphibious exercises in California, departing from San Diego on 17 October for her first deployment to the western Pacific. However, with the introduction of offensive missiles into Cuba resulting in the Cuban Missile Crisis on 19 October 1962, Iwo Jima returned to San Diego, embarked Marines from 22 to 27 October, and departed for the Caribbean. As part of America's powerful naval presence in the area, she cruised in a "ready" status until December brought an easing of the Cuban situation. She returned in San Diego on 13 December.

== Western Pacific cruises ==
Iwo Jima operated out of her home port during the first half of 1963, carrying out amphibious exercises and training. She departed on 30 August on her long-delayed Western Pacific cruise. Joining the 7th Fleet, she ranged from Hawaii to the Philippines and Taiwan.

On 31 October 1963, Iwo Jima departed Philippine waters for special operations along the coast of South Vietnam, standing by to protect American nationals during a period of increased tension. She returned to Subic Bay Naval Base on 12 November. The following months, she sailed with Special Landing Forces of Marines for rigorous amphibious assault and landing raids practice off the coasts of Taiwan and Okinawa. After unloading ammunition at Sasebo, Japan, she departed on 13 April 1964 to return to San Diego, arriving on 28 April. Following amphibious training with Marines along the California seaboard, she overhauled in the Long Beach Naval Shipyard. This work was completed by 7 December 1964, when Iwo Jima began amphibious refresher training ranging to the Hawaiian Islands. On 13 March 1965, she departed Pearl Harbor for San Diego, arriving six days later.

== Vietnam War ==
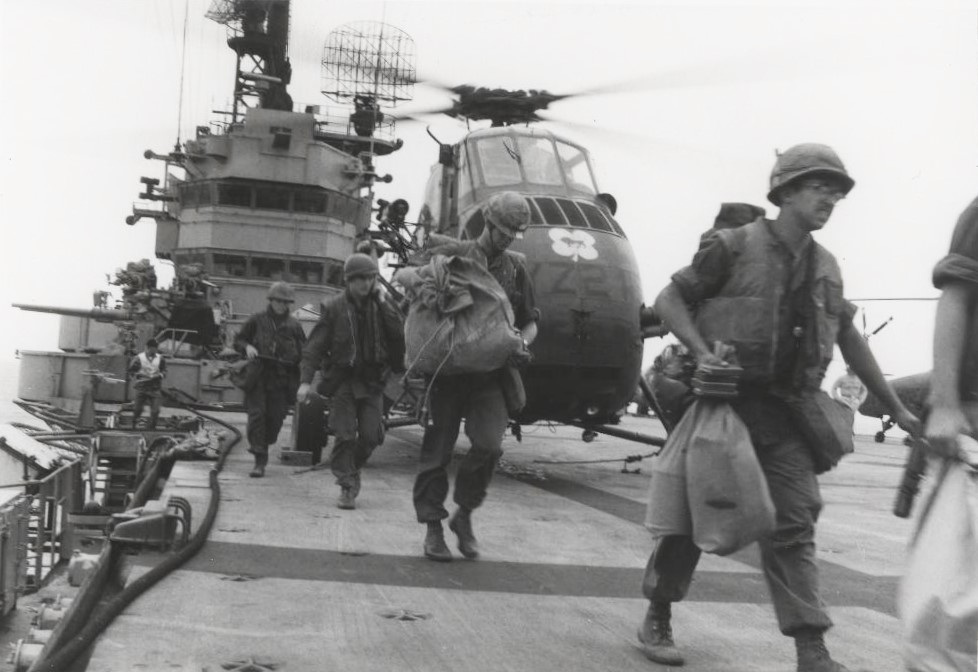
2/4 Marines board HMM-363 UH-34s, 12 March 1968

Iwo Jima received tons of supplies and scores of Army helicopters, tanker trucks, and vehicles in her hangar and flight deck spaces. Nearly 1,000 troops were embarked for her western transit, which began on 12 April 1965. She stopped at Pearl Harbor for a few hours on the 17th to off-load 50 Marines and their equipment. On 1/2 May, she steamed off Vũng Tàu, South Vietnam, flying off 77 Army helicopters loaded with troops and combat cargo. From there, she proceeded to Subic Bay in the Philippines, where troops and equipment were received for both amphibious and helicopter landings at Chu Lai, Vietnam, on 12 May 1965.

Iwo Jima remained off Chu Lai for a month, protecting Marines and Seabees establishing an air field on the sandy shore. Besides provides helicopter support for the forces ashore, including defense perimeter patrol, she was a support center for laundry, showers, fresh provisions, store, and mail service. She also supervised the continual off-load of ships over the beach for the entire month, then on 7 June 1965 landed squadron personnel and helicopters ashore at Phu Bai Combat Base, some 30 miles north of Da Nang. After a few days rest in Subic Bay, she was routed to Sasebo, thence to Buckner Bay, Okinawa, where she embarked Marines and equipment. This was completed on 26 June 1965, when she sailed for Qui Nhon, Republic of Vietnam, in company with USS Talladega and USS Point Defiance. These ships were designated Task Group 76.5, the part of the 7th Fleet that carried the Marine Special Landing Force. On the 30th, she arrived at Qui Nhon, about 100 miles south of Chu Lai. The following day, Marines landed ashore to take up defensive positions for the protection of Army engineers and communications units.

Iwo Jima remained off Qui Nhon for defensive support until 20 July 1965, then steamed for Pratas Reef about 240 miles southwest of Taiwan. Arriving the morning of the 22nd, her helicopters were immediately pressed into service to aid the salvage of destroyer USS Frank Knox. The close approach of typhoon "Gilda" pounded the grounded destroyer so badly that it was impossible for small boats to get alongside her. Extra men were heli-lifted off the destroyer while surf rose 12 feet high to break completely over the stern of Frank Knox. Support given by Iwo Jima included such items as hot food, clothes, water, pumps, hose, gasoline, air compressors, welding machines, damage control equipment, and technicians. Feed water was heli-lifted in special tanks constructed by the destroyer tender USS Prairie, which had faint hope of keeping the destroyer's boiler alive. Detached from this duty on 1 August 1965, Iwo Jima made a brief call at Hong Kong, then proceeded to the Philippines.

On 17 August 1965, Iwo Jima steamed out of Subic Bay for Vung Tau, Republic of Vietnam, to join in Operation Starlite, a five-day search-and-destroy operation that killed some 600 Viet Cong. The successful combined Navy and Marine Corps amphibious operation, backed by gunfire support from the cruiser USS Galveston and two destroyers, came to a close late on 24 August. Iwo Jima's evacuation and surgical teams kept the American casualties down to a very low percentage. During transit back to Subic Bay, the news came that Frank Knox had been refloated. Iwo Jima landed her Marine Special Landing Force at Chu Lai on 1/2 September, embarked 800 Marines of a rotation draft, and sailed for Buckner Bay.

Iwo Jima landed the rotation troops at Okinawa, then came off Qui Nhon, 10 September 1965, to cover the landing of the Army's 1st Air Cavalry Division. She had supported three amphibious assault search-and-destroy raids along the coast by 1 October, when she steamed to southern waters, remaining in stand-by status for possible evacuation of U.S. nationals in revolt-torn Indonesia. Eight days later, she sailed for Da Nang for a helicopter squadron exchange, thence to Subic Bay where she was relieved by USS Valley Forge. Following a visit to Yokosuka, she departed 1 November for return to San Diego, arriving 17 November 1965. Several months later, she again joined the 7th Fleet Amphibious Ready Group, a fast-moving assault force that had completed more than 20 search-and-destroy operations along the South Vietnamese coast between March 1965 and September 1966. One of these missions, Operation Deckhouse IV hit only 3 miles south of the Vietnamese Demilitarized Zone to search for and decimate a regiment of the People's Army of Vietnam 342B Division which had infiltrated into South Vietnam.

During the first three months of 1966, Iwo Jima was at San Diego for upkeep and upgrades. From April through June, extensive refresher training occupied all hands as Iwo Jima prepared for her forthcoming Western Pacific deployment. On 24 July, steaming with a task group, she passed the island of Iwo Jima with one of the Marine groups that had landed on Iwo Jima over two decades earlier on board. After operations in the Vietnam area, she sailed for Japan. Iwo Jima was on the line and underway for special operations in the Mekong Delta region of South Vietnam by 30 December once again, in a Navy-ready group with a two-pronged punch. Early in January 1967, the commanding officer, Captain Nils W. Boe, was relieved by Captain F. X. Timmes. On his departure, Captain Boe said of his crew in a family-gram to mothers and wives, "I want to thank each of you for letting me borrow these magnificent young men for a little while. They have made me feel ten feet tall." On 1 July 1967, Iwo Jima was reassigned to Amphibious Squadron 3 from Amphibious Squadron 1, with which she continued to sail with the Pacific Fleet.

== Pacific recovery forces (Task Force 130) ==
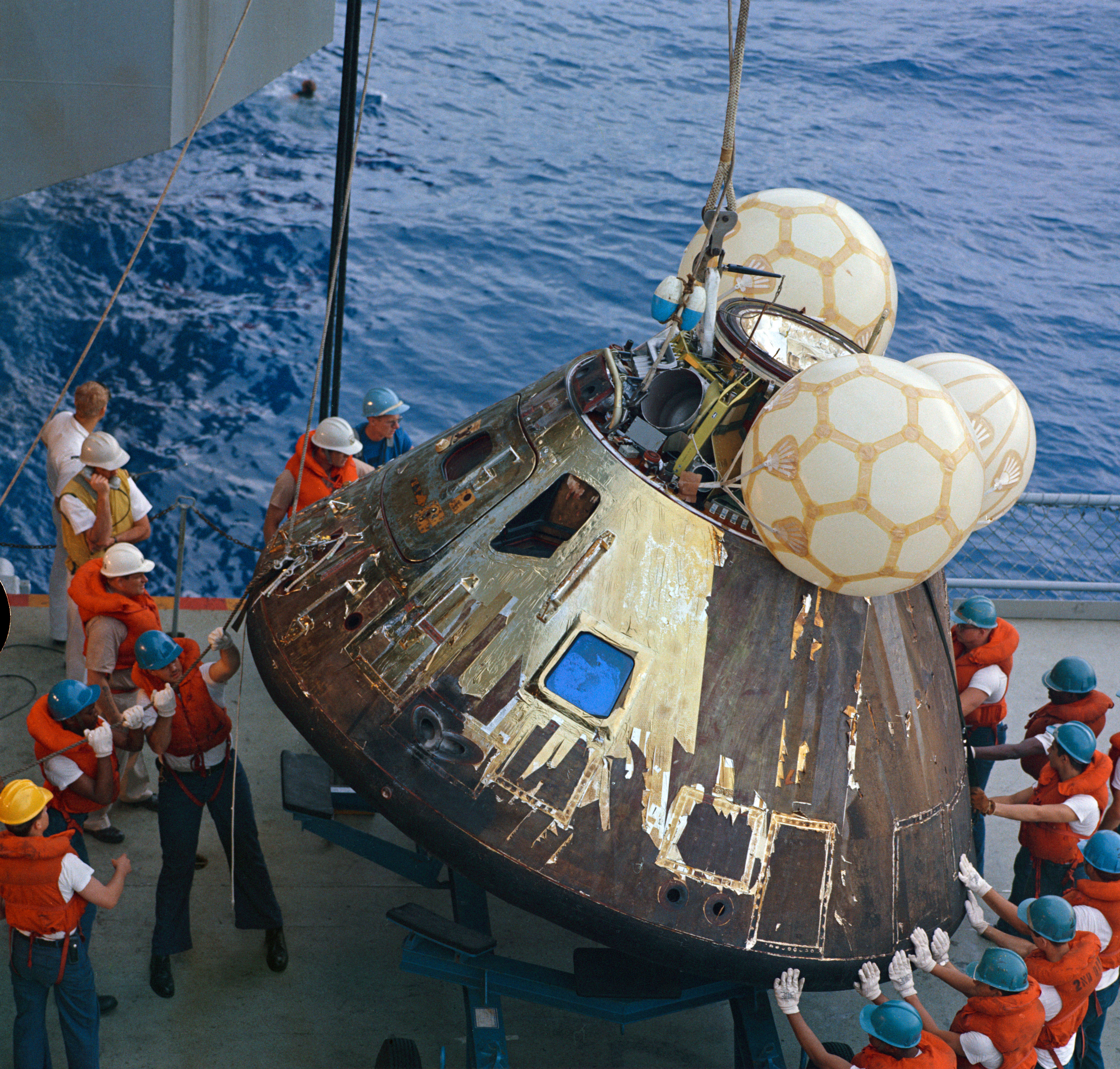
Crews on the Iwo Jima hoisting the Apollo 13 command module Odyssey on board.

On 17 April 1970, Iwo Jima was the flagship of Task Force 130 that waited for the Apollo 13 spaceship's astronauts after their memorable "successful failure" mission and splashdown near American Samoa.

In the 1995 film Apollo 13, Iwo Jima was played by her sister ship, New Orleans (LPH-11). Iwo Jima's skipper, Captain Leland Kirkemo, is portrayed by the film's central protagonist, Captain Jim Lovell.

== Multinational Peacekeeping Force ==
From 10 May 1983 to 8 December 1983, Iwo Jima operated off the Lebanese coast as part of Mediterranean Amphibious Ready Group 2-83 (Marg 2-83). The ships hosted the 24th Marine Amphibious Unit (24th MAU), the main body of which disembarked on 29 May to take position in and around Beirut International Airport, relieving the 22nd MAU as the principal US component of the Multinational Force in Lebanon. On 23 October 1983, an attack on the Marine's barracks caused the death of 241 US servicemen and wounded a further 60. The ship's commanding officer at the time was Arden W. Jones, CAPT USN. During the deployment, it served as the flagship for Amphibious Squadron Eight (PHIBRON-8), with Morgan France, CAPT USN serving as squadron commander (AKA Commodore").

== Friendly fire incident ==
On 11 October 1989, El Paso (LKA-117) was conducting a live fire exercise off the east coast of the United States using the Phalanx against a target drone. The drone was successfully engaged, but as the drone fell to the sea, the CIWS re-engaged it as a continued threat to El Paso. Rounds from the Phalanx struck the bridge of Iwo Jima, killing one officer and injuring a petty officer.

== Catastrophic boiler accident ==
In October 1990, Iwo Jima was in the Persian Gulf, as part of the buildup for Operation Desert Shield. After two months of operation in the region she had developed a leak in a steam valve which supplied steam to a stand-by electrical generator. She docked in Manama, Bahrain, where the valve was repaired by a local contractor under US government inspection.

Repairs were completed towards the end of October. On 30 October, as she raised steam to get underway and rejoin the fleet, the valve began to leak once more. The bonnet blew off the valve, flooding the boiler room with steam from two boilers. Ten of the eleven crewmen in the room were killed during or immediately after the incident, with the last surviving until 23:30 that evening.

The cause of the accident was determined to be the use of fasteners of the wrong material (namely black oxide coated brass) on the valve, combined with a lack of proper inspection.

== Decommissioning ==
Iwo Jima was decommissioned on 14 July 1993, and struck from the Naval Vessel Register on 24 September. She was sold for scrap on 18 December 1995. The ship's island was at the Museum of the American GI in College Station, Texas, for several years but due to no funding for maintenance it was scrapped.

== Potential role in the Falklands War ==
A July 2012 article by USNI News of the United States Naval Institute revealed that the Reagan Administration offered the use of Iwo Jima as a replacement in case either of the two British carriers, Hermes and Invincible, had been damaged or destroyed during the 1982 Falklands War. This top-secret contingency plan was revealed to the staff of the Naval Institute by John Lehman, the U.S. Secretary of the Navy at the time of the Falklands War, from a speech provided to the Naval Institute that Lehman made in Portsmouth, UK on 26 June 2012. Lehman stated that the loan of Iwo Jima was made in response to a request from the Royal Navy, and it had the endorsement of U.S. President Ronald Reagan and U.S. Secretary of Defense Caspar Weinberger. The actual planning for Iwo Jima loan-out was done by the staff of the U.S. Second Fleet under the direction of Vice Admiral James Lyons, who confirmed Lehman's revelations with the Naval Institute staff. Contingency planning envisioned American military contractors, likely retired sailors with knowledge of Iwo Jima's systems, assisting the British in manning the U.S. helicopter carrier during the loan-out. Naval analyst Eric Wertheim compared this arrangement to the Flying Tigers. Significantly, except for U.S. Secretary of State Alexander Haig, the U.S. Department of State was not included in the loan-out negotiations.

== Awards ==
- Combat Action Ribbon with 2 awards
- Navy Unit Commendation with 2 awards
- Navy Meritorious Unit Commendation with 5 awards
- Navy Battle "E" Ribbon with 2 awards
- Navy Expeditionary Medal
- National Defense Service Medal with 2 awards
- Armed Forces Expeditionary Medal
- Vietnam Service Medal with 8 awards
- Southwest Asia Service Medal
- Armes Forces Service Medal with 3 awards
- Humanitarian Service Medal
- Sea Service Deployment Ribbon
- Republic of Vietnam Gallantry Cross Unit Citation
- Republic of Vietnam Campaign Medal
- Kuwait Liberation Medal (Saudi Arabia)
- Kuwait Liberation Medal (Kuwait)

== Gallery ==
USS Iwo Jima Lifecycle

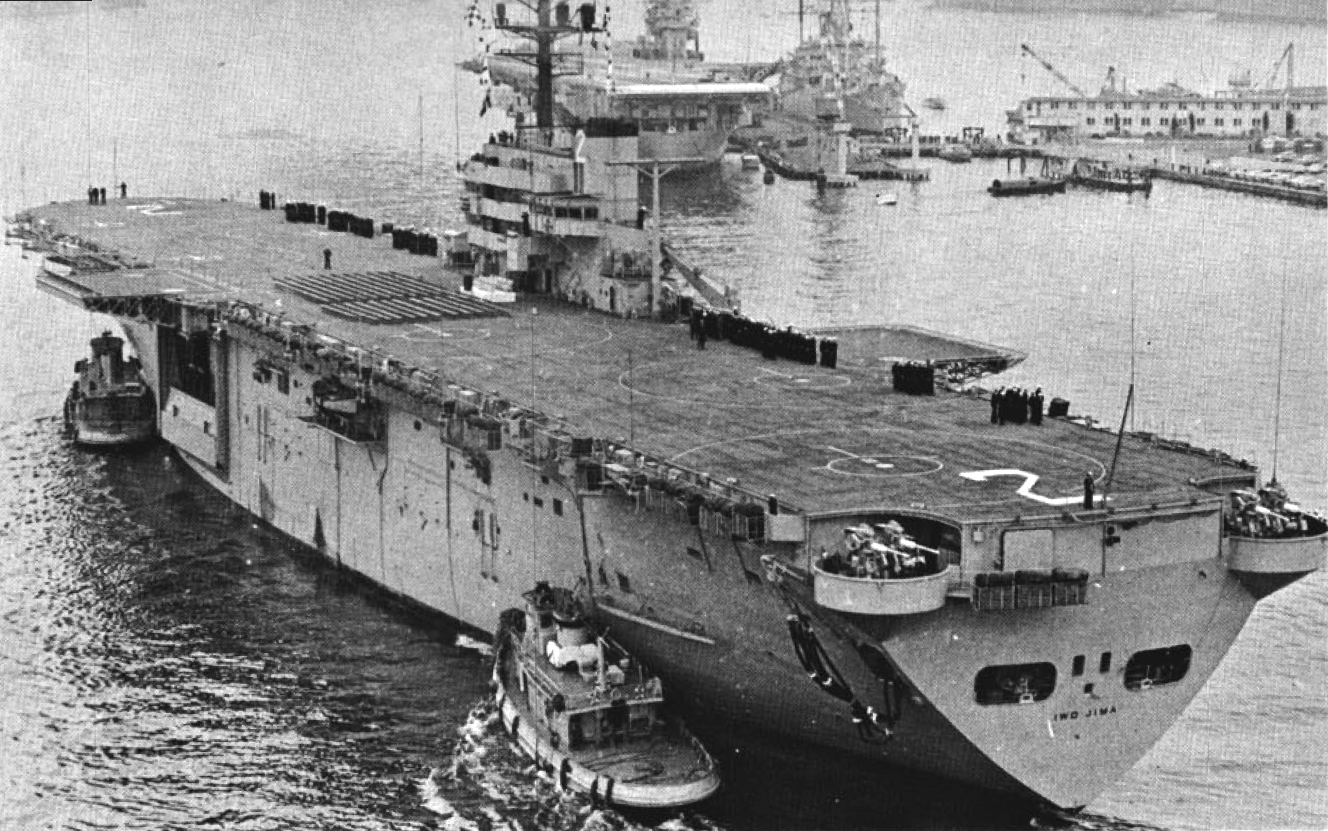
USS Iwo Jima being towed by a tug in c1962.

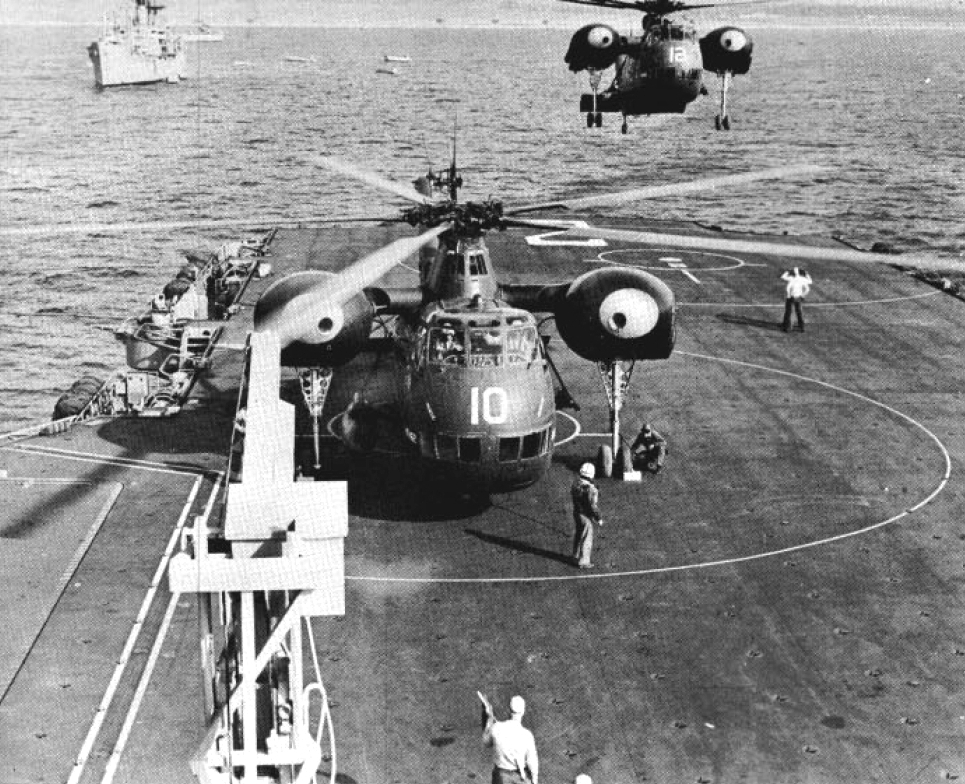
Sikorsky CH-37C Mojaves landing on USS Iwo Jima in c1963,

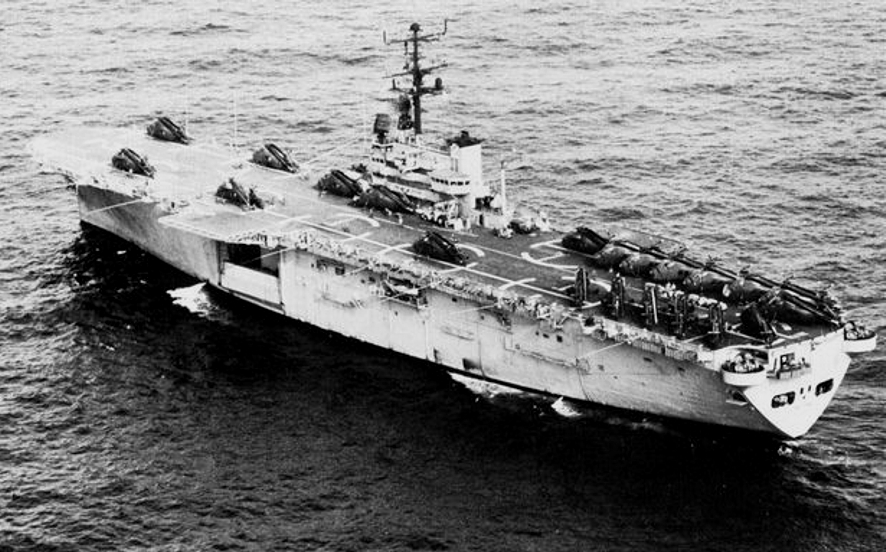
USS Iwo Jima at sea in c1966.

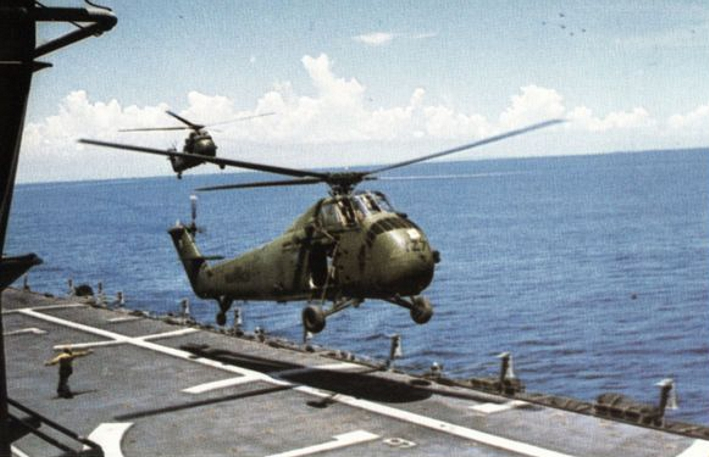
UH-34Ds Seahorses of HMM-363 land on USS Iwo Jima in c1966.

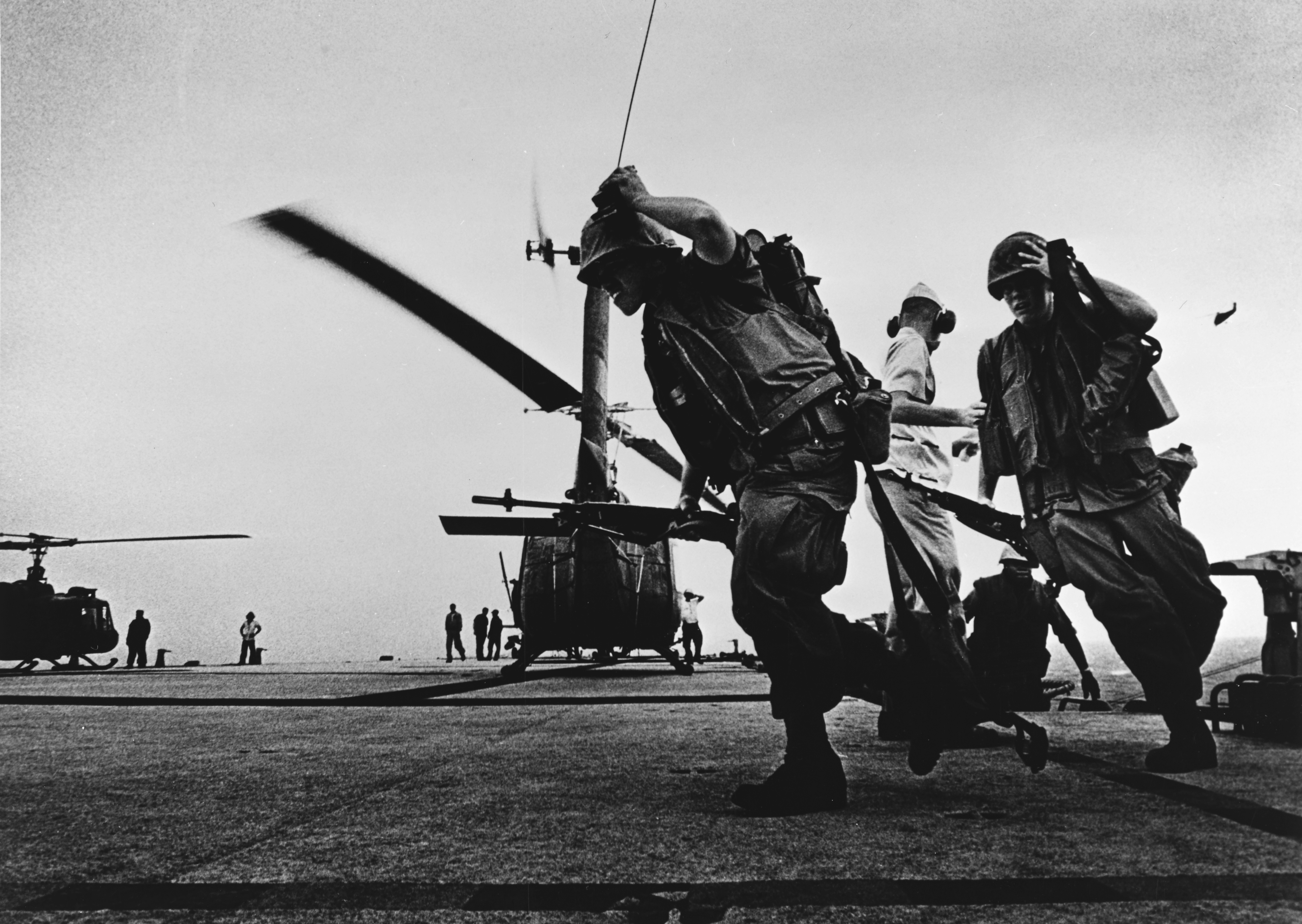
UH-1E Hueys on USS Iwo Jima in January 1967.

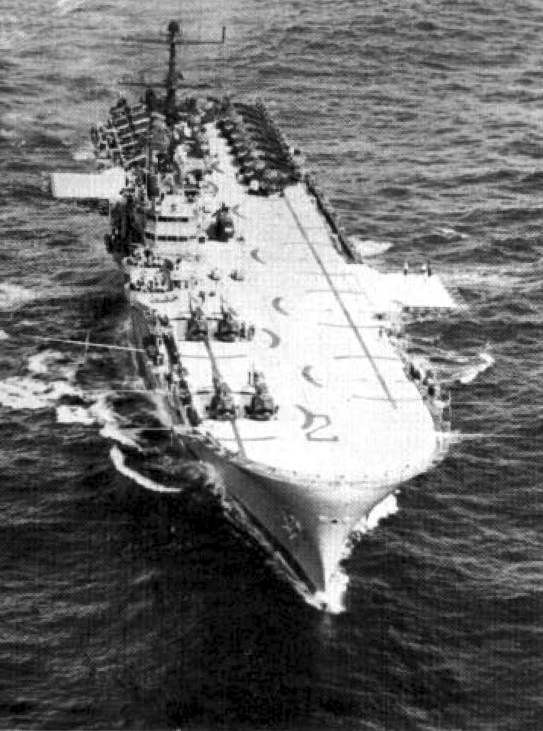
USS Iwo Jima testing her white flight deck in c1967.

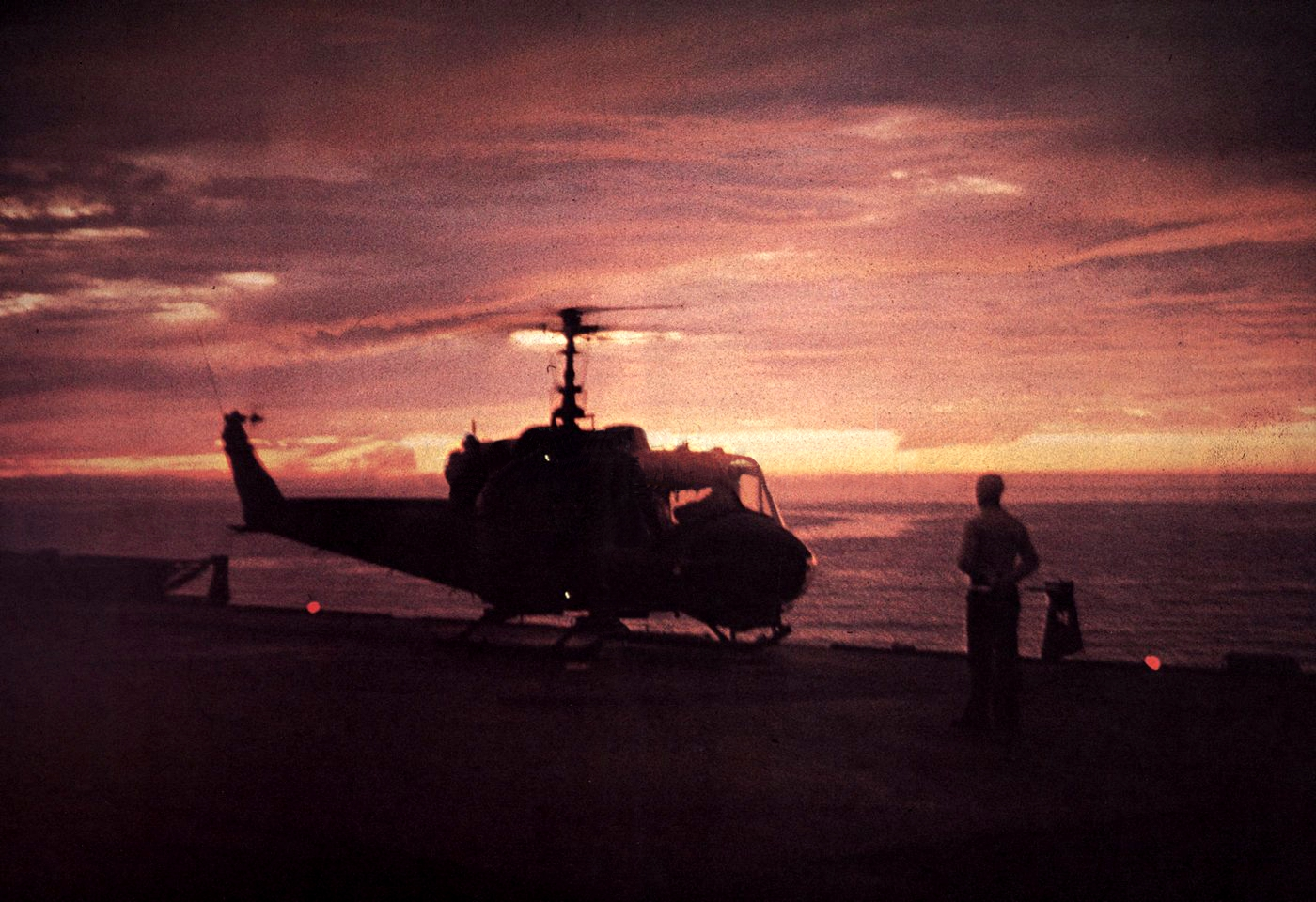
A UH-1E Huey aboard USS Iwo Jima in c1968.

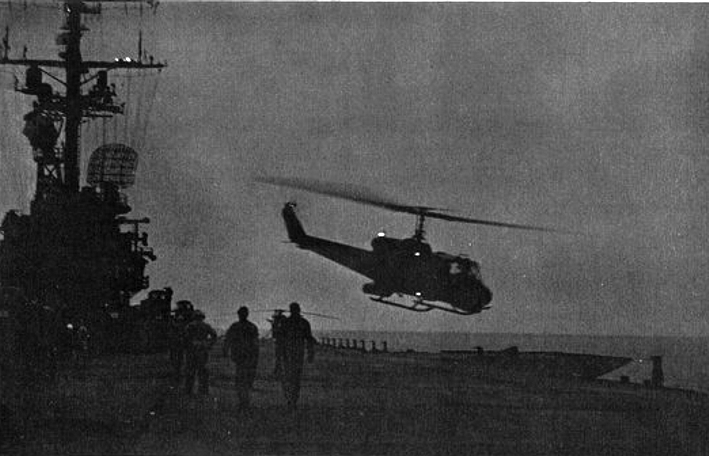
UH-1E takes off from USS Iwo Jima in c1968.

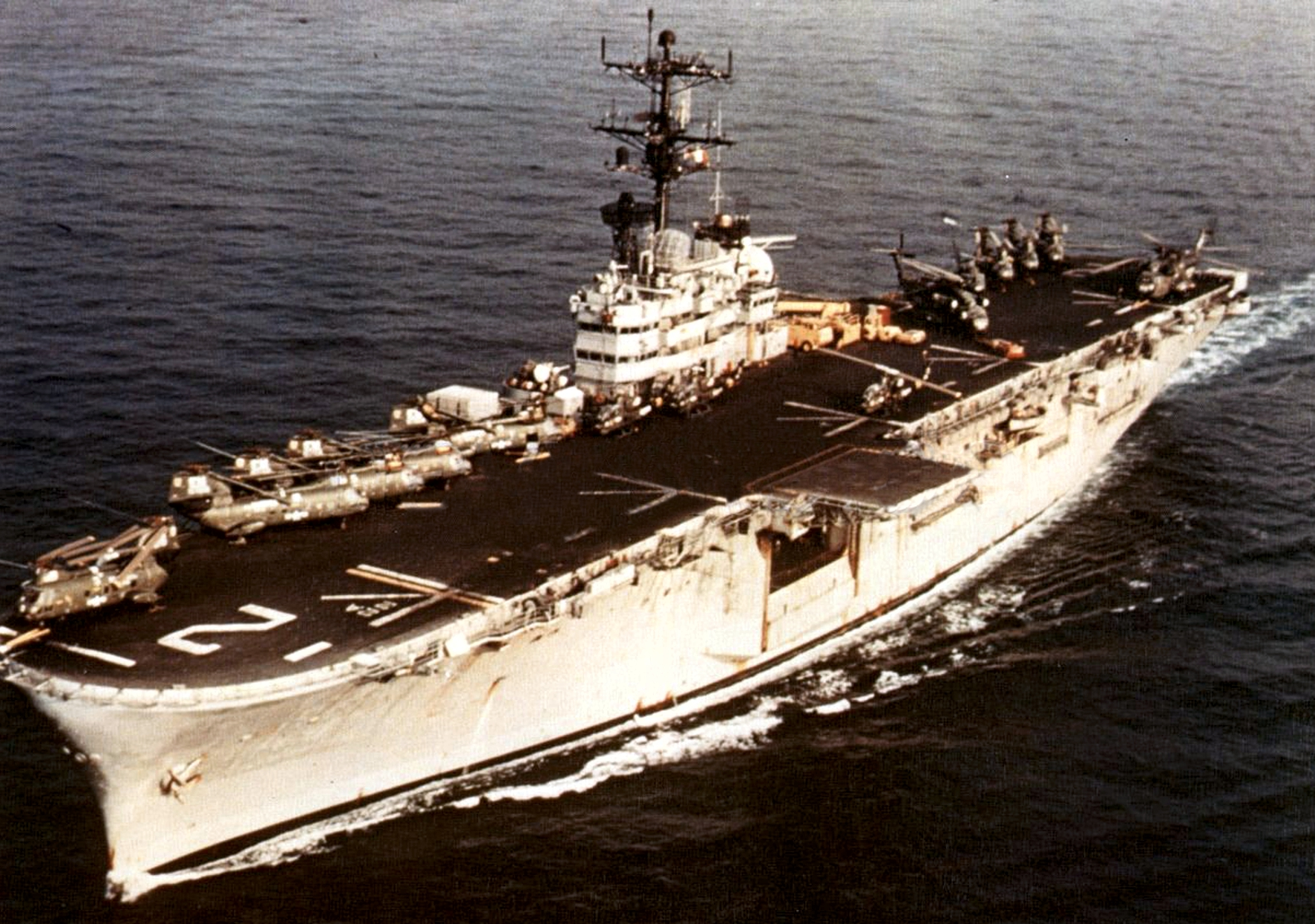
USS Iwo Jima underway at sea in 1974.

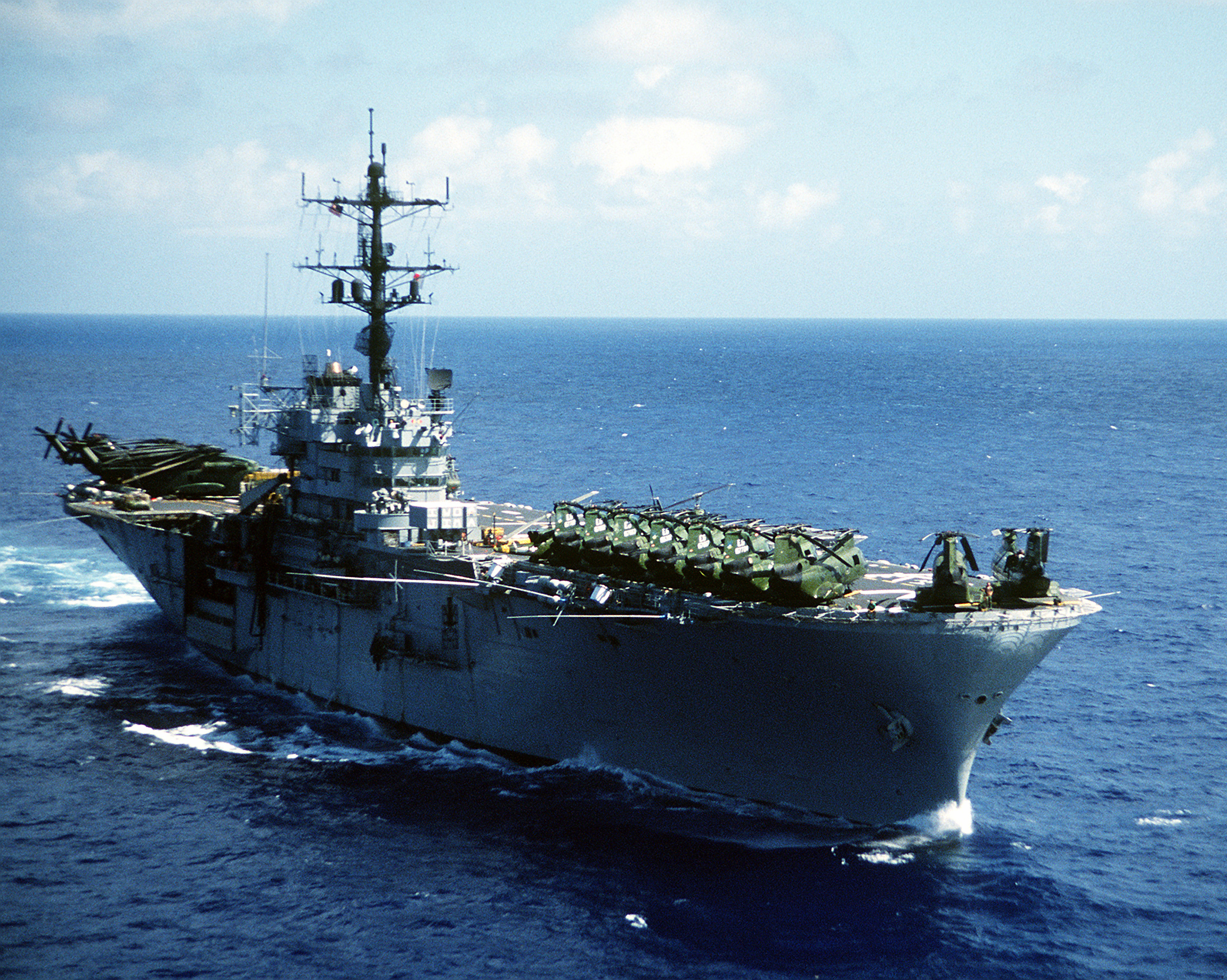
USS Iwo Jima underway in 1979.

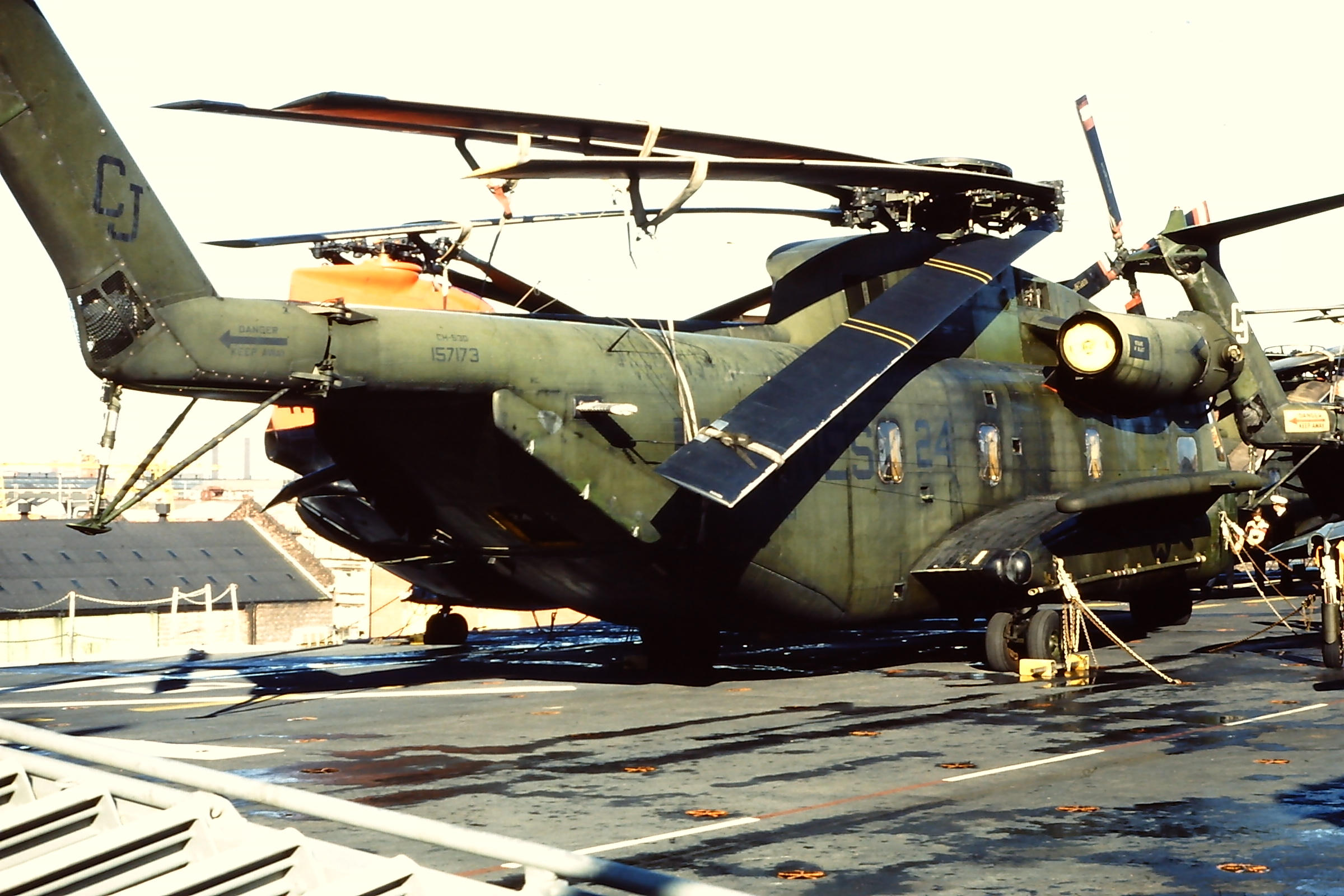
Sikorsky CH-35D Sea Stallion aboard USS Iwo Jima in 1980.

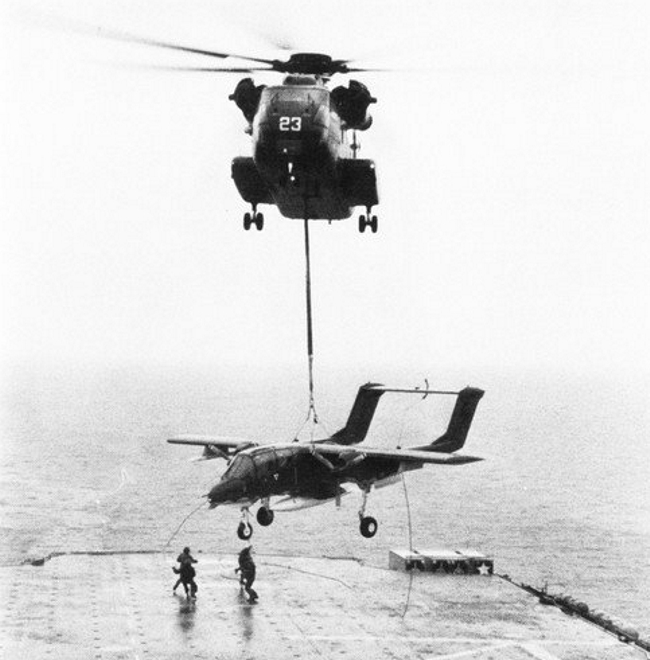
CH-53 Sea Stallion carrying an OV-10 Bronco over USS Iwo Jima in 1980.

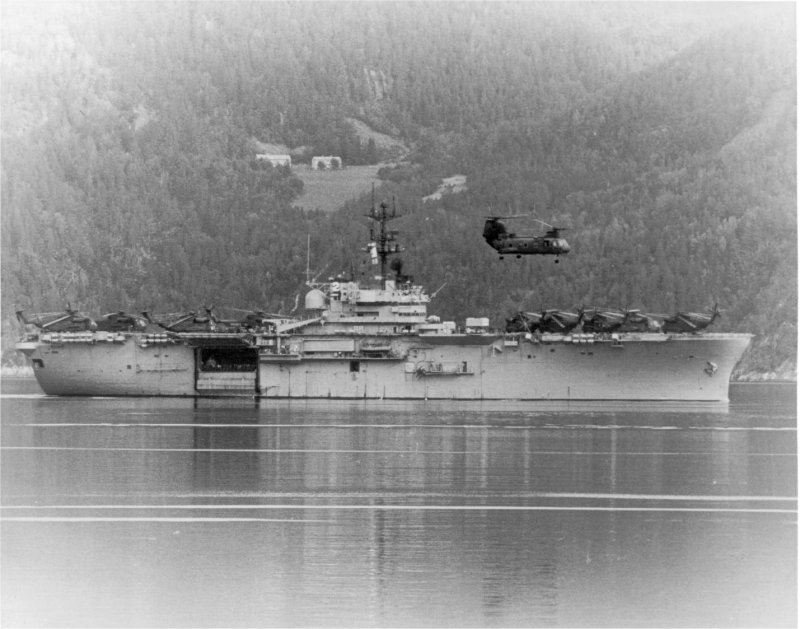
USS Iwo Jima underway off Norway in September 1980.

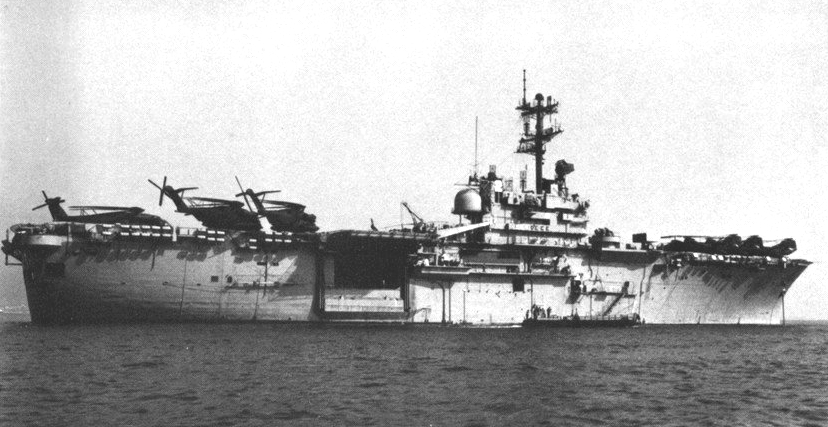
USS Iwo Jima off Lebanon in 1983.

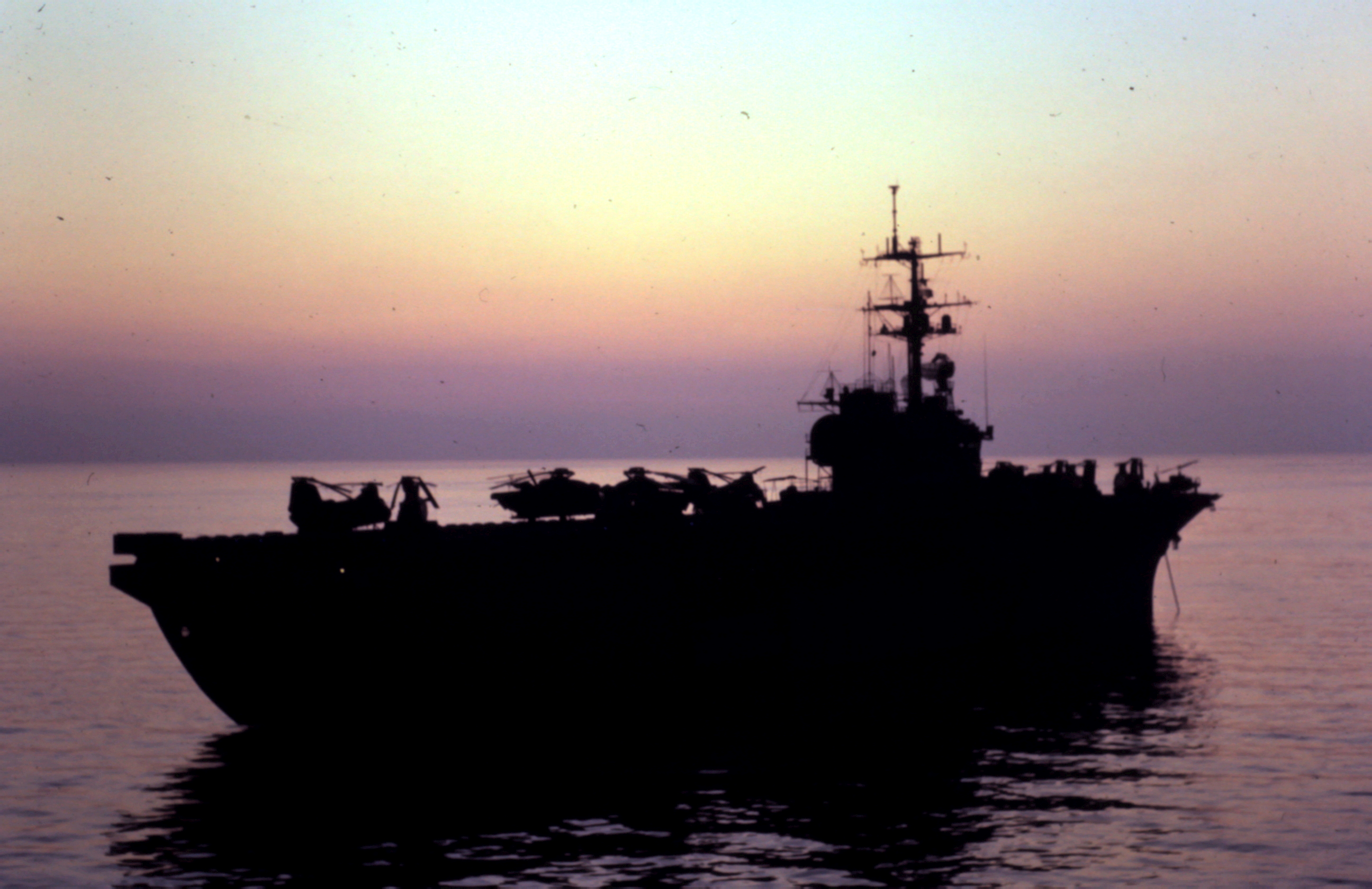
USS Iwo Jima at anchor off Beirut in 1983.

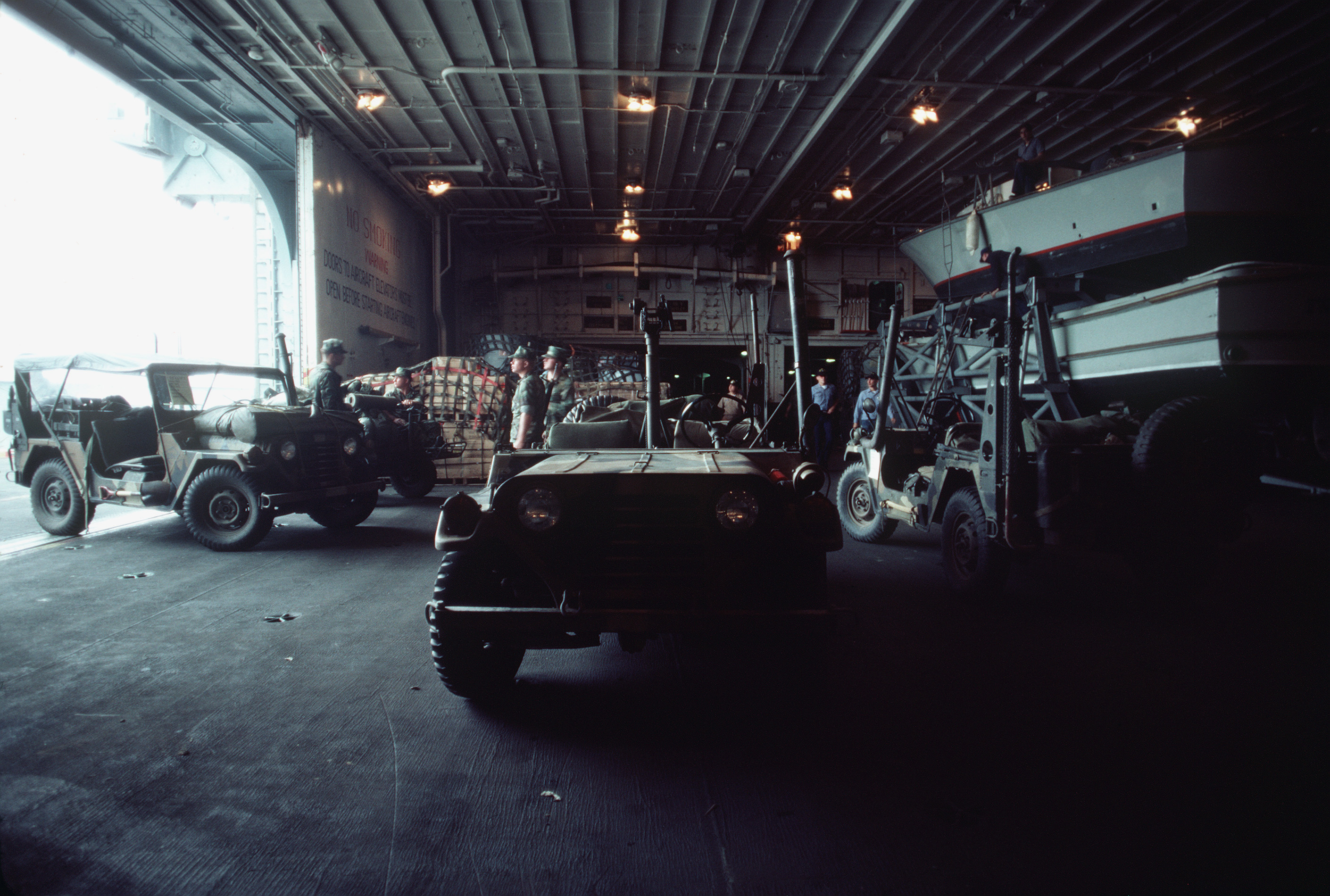
USS Iwo Jima during exercise "Ocean Venture" in 1984.

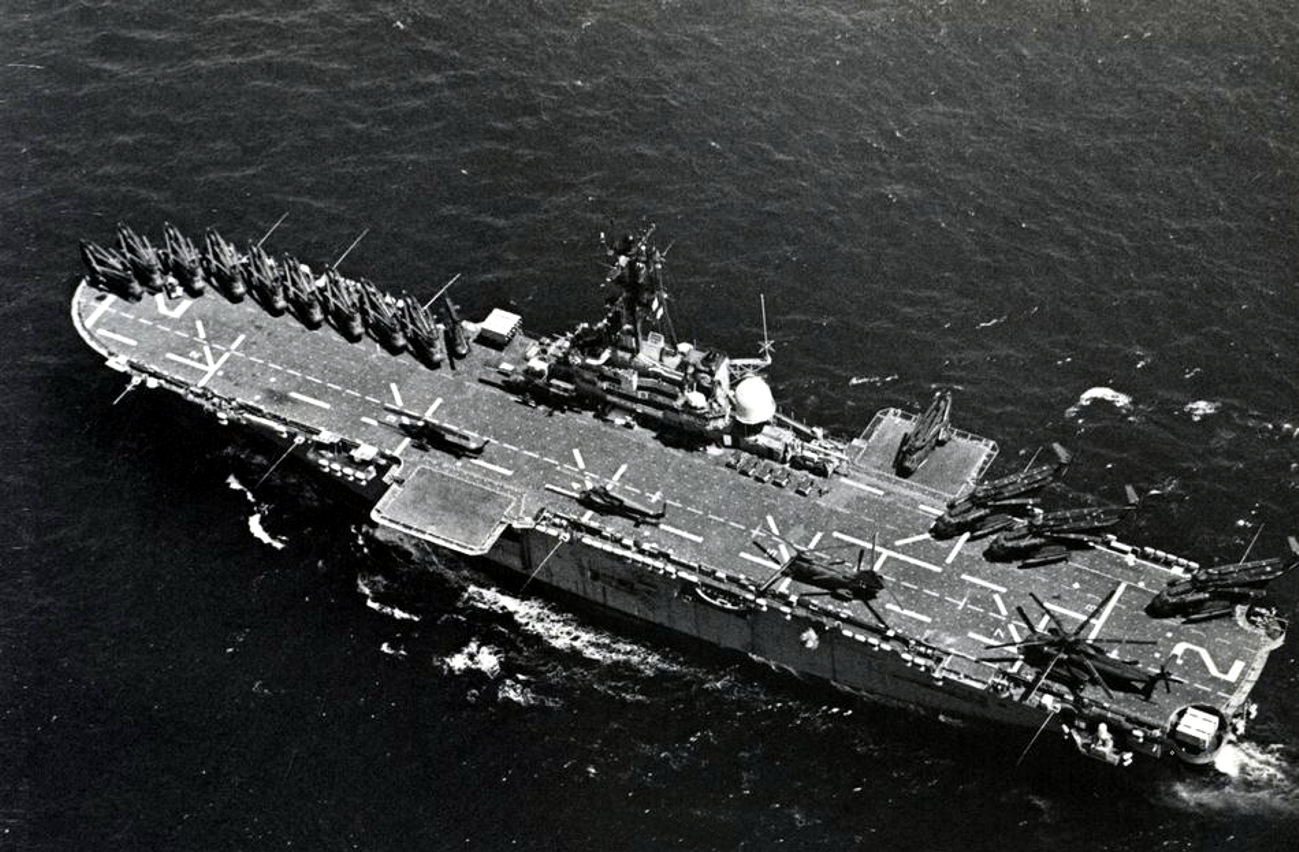
USS Iwo Jima underway at sea in 1985.

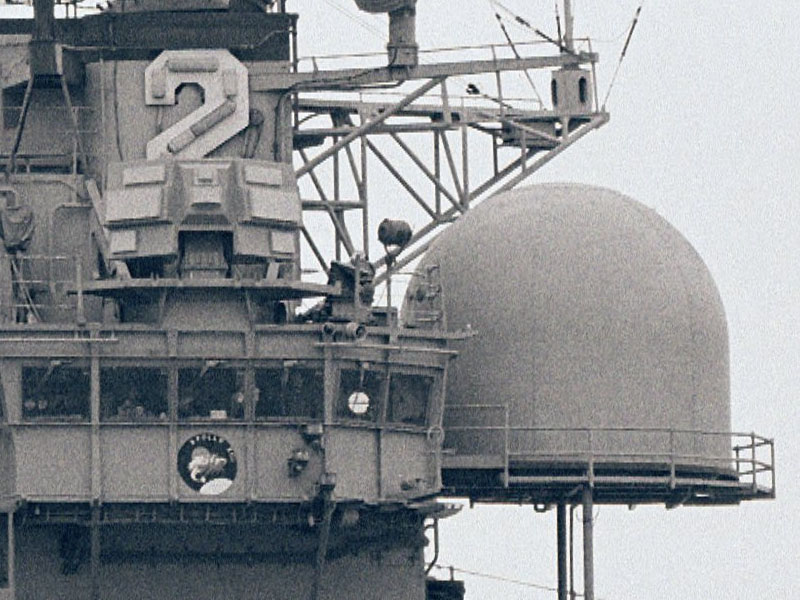
SPN-35 Approach Radar on USS Iwo Jima's bridge on 27 February 1987.

== Bibliography ==
- Doa, Tom (1996). "Question 25/93: USN/USCG Collisions with Merchant Vessels". Warship International. XXXIII (3): 319. ISSN 0043-0374.
- Jackson, Robert (2004). Fighting Ships of The World. London: Amber Books. p. 376. ISBN 978-1-84013-647-0.
