= United States Marine Corps Air Traffic Control Units =

Marine Air Traffic Control Units
- Active: 1952 - 1980
- Country: United States of America
- Branch: United States Marine Corps
- Type: Air Traffic Control; Ground-controlled approach
- Size: ~75 men
- Engagements: Vietnam War

Marine Air Traffic Control Units (MATCU) were United States Marine Corps air traffic control (ATC) detachments that provided continuous, all-weather, radar and non-radar, approach, departure, enroute, and tower ATC services at both garrison Marine Corps Air Stations and tactical airfields when deployed. MATCUs possessed Tactical air navigation systems (TACAN) and Ground-controlled approach (GCA) equipment which assisted Marine Corps, joint and coalition aircraft in conducting landings during inclement weather. During the Vietnam War, numerous MATCUs served throughout the I Corps Tactical region of South Vietnam supporting the III Marine Amphibious Force. Beginning in the mid-1970s, the Marine Corps decided to consolidate regionally aligned MATCUs into Marine Air Traffic Control Squadrons. The last reserve MATCU was decommissioned in 1980.

== Background ==
The MATCUs were formed beginning in 1952 when existing air traffic control services at each major Marine Corps Air Station or Facility was reorganized into a tactical unit capable of deploying in support of real-world operations. These new units provided deployable surveillance radars, ground-controlled approach, TACANs, radio direction finding, control towers, and communications equipment. While in garrison, controllers from the MATCUs augmented station approach control facilities and air traffic control towers. In most instances, the MATCUs fell under the command of the local Marine Air Base Squadrons (MABS). Each Marine Aircraft Group had an assigned MABS which was responsible for providing airfield services. In cases where a MABS was not present, the MATCUs reported to the air station's Headquarters and Headquarters Squadron or a resident Marine Air Control Squadron. The table of organization for the MATCUs was identical across the fleet and consisted of 6 officers and 67 enlisted Marines. In the early 1970s the Marine Corps began experiencing a sustained shortage of trained air traffic controllers and maintenance personnel. To address this systemic issue the service decided to consolidate regionally aligned MATCUs into singular squadrons assigned to each Marine Air Wing. The first Marine Air Traffic Control Squadron was commissioned in 1976 and with the commissioning of the last one in the reserves in 1980 the last MATCU was decommissioned. Since that time, no other units have carried the lineage and honors of the MATCUs.

== Equipment ==
- AN/MPN, AN/CPN-4 (Ground Control Approach Facility), AN/MSQ-4 (Mobile Tower)
- AN/TSQ-18 - Family of ATC equipment consisting of two GCA radars, one medium range radar and two TACANs primarily designed to work with the Small Airfield for Tactical Support (SATS) system.

== MATCU Histories ==
=== MATCU-60 ===
The unit was commissioned on 1 January 1952 as Marine Air Traffic Control Unit 7 (MATCU-7) under MGCIS-7. Redesignated as MATCU-31 under MAG-31 on 1 April 1952. The unit was again redesignated as MATCU-11 under MAG-11 on 2 August 1953. On 8 February 1954 the unit received its final designation as Marine Air Traffic Control Unit 60 (MATCU-60). On 16 August 1966, MATCU-60 was attached to Marine Air Base Squadron 15 (MABS-15). On 28 May 1972, MATCU-60 personnel departed MCAS Iwakuni for MCAS Rose Garden, Thailand in order to support Marine Aircraft Group 15 missions being flown in support of forces against North Vietnam's Easter Offensive. MATCU-60 was decommissioned on 1 October 1978 when its personnel and equipment were consolidated with MATCU-62 to form Detachment "A" of the newly established Marine Air Traffic Control Squadron 18 (MATCS-18).

=== MATCU-61 ===
Commissioned on 8 September 1953 as Marine Air Traffic Control Unit 14 (MATCU-14), Marine Aircraft Group 14 at Marine Corps Air Station Cherry Point, North Carolina. The unit was re-designated as Marine Air Traffic Control Unit 61 on 1 October 1953. MATCU-61 remained at Cherry Point supporting operations Europe, the Caribbean and in CONUS. MATCU-61 was at NAAS Edenton, NC 1956-1958. The unit was decommissioned on 23 April 1976 and its personnel and equipment initially formed Marine Air Traffic Control Unit 23 under Marine Air Traffic Control Squadron 28 (MATCS-28).

=== MATCU-62 ===
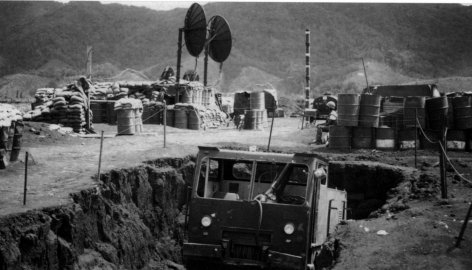
MATCU-62 detachment supporting Marine Corps operations at Khe Sanh in 1968.

Marine Air Traffic Control Unit 4 was commissioned on 23 August 1951 under Marine Ground Control Intercept Squadron 4 at Marine Corps Air Station Santa Ana, California. On 1 April 1952 it was re-designated a sub-unit of Marine Air Base Squadron 15 at Marine Corps Air Station El Toro, California. The unit was again re-designated as Marine Air Traffic Control Unit 62 (MATCU-62) on 10 February 1954. MATCU-62 relocated to Marine Corps Air Station Kaneohe Bay, Hawaii in January 1955 as part of Marine Air Base Squadron 13. The unit deployed to South Vietnam on 1 September 1966. During its time in Vietnam the unit provided air traffic and GCA services at the Đông Hà Combat Base, Khe Sanh Combat Base, Quảng Trị Combat Base and Vandegrift Combat Base. MATCU-62 departed Vietnam on 20 February 1970 relocating to Marine Corps Air Station Iwakuni, Japan. On 28 May 1972, MATCU-62 deployed to Royal Thai Air Base Nam Phong, Thailand. It departed Thailand in September 1973 returning to MCAS Iwakuni in October 1973. MATCU-62 was decommissioned on 1 October 1978 when its personnel and equipment were consolidated with MATCU-60 to form Detachment "A" of the newly established Marine Air Traffic Control Squadron 18 (MATCS-18).

=== MATCU-63 ===
Marine Air Traffic Control Unit 24 was formed on 8 September 1953 as a sub-unit of Marine Air Base Squadron 24 at MCAS Cherry Point, NC. The unit was re-designated as MATCU-63 on 30 September 1953. On 1 August 1964, MATCU-63 was transferred from under the control of MACS-6 to Marine Airbase Squadron 32. The unit was decommissioned on 23 April 1976and its personnel and equipment became Marine Air Traffic Control Squadron 28, Detachment A.

=== MATCU-64 ===
Originally commissioned as MATCU-32 under Marine Air Base Squadron 32 on 8 September 1953. MATCU-32 was re-designated as MATCU-64 on 1 October 1953. In July 1958 the unit deployed onboard the USS Antietam (CV-36) with other elements of Marine Aircraft Group 26 in response to a growing crisis in Lebanon. The unit did not go ashore in Lebanon and returned to Edenton in September 1958.

=== MATCU-65 ===
MATCU-65 was commissioned on 7 February 1954 in Pohang, South Korea. Most of the equipment and original manpower for MATCU-65 came from the recently decommissioned GCA Det 41-M and MATCU-33 however it did not inherit the lineage of either of these units. On 8 September 1956, MATCU-65 personnel and equipment were embarked upon the USS Corregidor and sailed for home. The unit arrived in San Francisco on 19 September 1956 and finally arrived at Marine Corps Air Station Mojave, California on 22 September. MATCU-65 remained at MCAS Mojave until 1958 when it moved to the Marine Corps newest air station, Marine Corps Air Station Yuma, Arizona. On 3 January 1967 control of MATCU-65 was transferred from Marine Air Control Squadron 1 (MACS-1) to Marine Air Base Squadron 33.

"Old 65", as it was nicknamed, was reassigned to Marine Combat Crew Readiness Training Group 10 (MCCRTG-10) on 1 March 1972. Marine MATCU-65 provided air traffic control serves at MCAS Yuma until 27 April 1976 when the unit was subsumed into the newly formed Marine Air Traffic Control Squadron 38 (MATCS-38).

=== MATCU-66 ===
GCA Unit 37M began operations as the Marine Corps' first GCA detachment at MCAS El Toro, CA on 10 March 1947. The detachment departed Southern California in July 1950 at the outbreak of the Korean War. On 18 September 1950, GCA Unit 37M came ashore at Inchon as the Marine Corps' first ever deployed air traffic control detachment. The unit provided GCA services at Kimpo Air Base outside of Seoul until December 1950 at which point it was flown to Itami Air Base in Japan. The detachment later joined Marine Aircraft Group 11 at Naval Air Station Atsugi in September 1953.

MATCU-66 arrived in South Vietnam on 19 May 1962 supporting aviation operations out of Sóc Trăng while simultaneously providing TACAN and GCA services at Udorn Royal Thai Air Force Base, Thailand. The unit ceased operations on 28 July 1962 and returned to NAS Atsugi. On 20 July 1965, MATCU-66 relocated to MCAS Iwakuni. This was followed by another move to MCAS Futenma on 27 January 1966. The unit sent a detachment forward to South Vietnam on 15 April 1968. MATCU-66A was assigned to support Marine Aircraft Group 36 at Quảng Trị Combat Base. On 10 October 1968, MATCU-66A was re-designated as MATCU-62A thus ending the unit's presence in South Vietnam. MATCU-66 was decommissioned on 1 October 1978 when its personnel and equipment formed part of the newly established Marine Air Traffic Control Squadron 18 (MATCS-18) on Marine Corps Air Station Futenma.

=== MATCU-67 ===
MATCU-67 was commissioned on 15 December 1959. On 9 April 1962, MATCU-67 began deploying to South Vietnam in support of HMM-362 during Operation Shufly. The unit supported operations at Sóc Trăng Airfield until 15 September 1962 when it returned to MCAS Futenma on Okinawa. MAG-16s departure from Futenma in early 1965 saw MATCU-67 headquarters shifted to MCAS Iwakuni. When Marine Aircraft Group 12 (MAG-12), based at Iwakuni, deployed to South Vietnam in April 1965, MATCU-67 went with them. On 27 April, the unit embarked upon the USS Windham County (LST-1170) and sailed for Vietnam. MATCU-67 offloaded at Chu Lai on 11 May 1965 and began establishing air traffic control services in support of Marine Aircraft Group 12. The field became operational on 1 June 1965. MATCU-67 operated from Chu Lai until 15 September 1970 when Chu Lai was closed. During its time in South Vietnam, MATCU-67 conducted 1,455,432 tower operations, 69,146 GCA operations and 177,963 approach control operations. Upon leaving Vietnam, MATCU-67 was transferred to the 3rd Marine Aircraft Wing and provided ATC services at Marine Corps Air Station Tustin.

=== MATCU-68 ===
Deployed in April 1962 to provide GCA and TACAN services at Sóc Trăng as part of Marine Airbase Squadron 16 in support of Operation Shufly. The unit returned to Okinawa in September 1962 when the SHUFLY units moved north to Da Nang Air Base where air traffic control services were being provided by the United States Air Force.

Deployed again to South Vietnam in July 1965 and in August 1965 established air traffic control services at the newly constructed Marble Mountain Air Facility in support of Marine Aircraft Group 36. In March 1966 MATCU-68 was relocated to the Phu Bai Combat Base while maintaining tower control at Marble Mountain. From October 1966 until 15 February 1967 the unit also assumed responsibility for ATC services at the Khe Sanh Combat Base. At the same time control of Khe Sanh was divested the unit assumed responsibility for providing services at the An Hoa Combat Base. MATCU-68 remained in Vietnam until June 1971 when it was relocated to Okinawa, Japan. This was followed by another relocation to MCAS Quantico on 25 December 1971.

MATCU-68 officially arrived at Marine Corps Air Station Quantico on 14 January 1972. At the time the unit fell under the command of Marine Aircraft Group 26.

=== MATCU-69 ===
Commissioned in 1964 at Marine Corps Air Station Beaufort, South Carolina. The original cadre of Marines that formed the unit came from MATCU-63. MATCU-69 was decommissioned on 23 April 1976 and its personnel and equipment were transferred to the newly formed MATCS-28.

=== MATCU-70 ===
MATCU-70 was established in June 1965 at MCAS El Toro. It was later moved to MCAS Kaneohe Bay, Hawaii to fill the gap created by MATCU-62's deployment to South Vietnam. A detachment from MATCU-70 arrived at Phu Bai, South Vietnam on 20 October 1967. On 24 October, the detachment was airlifted to Quang Tri where it fell under the command of MABS-36 while supporting Marine Aircraft Group 36. MATCU-70 remained in Quang Tri supporting operations until being relieved by MATCU-66 on 20 April 1968. In July 1969, a 16 Marine detachment from MATCU-70 departed MCAS K-Bay to Johnston Atoll to provide air traffic services for Air Force One during the Apollo 11 mission to the moon. President Nixon flew to Johnston before boarding Marine One and flying to the USS Hornet (CV-12) to greet the returning astronauts. MATCU-70 returned to MCAS Kaneohe Bay by the end of April 1970. The unit was decommissioned on 1 October 1978 when its personnel and equipment formed Detachment "B" of the newly established Marine Air Traffic Control Squadron 18 (MATCS-18).

=== MATCU-71 ===
Reserve MATCU based out of Naval Air Station Memphis, Tennessee.

=== MATCU-72 ===
Reserve MATCU based out of Naval Air Station Olathe, Kansas. The unit was decommissioned on 29 November 1974.

=== MATCU-73 ===
Reserve MATCU based out of Naval Air Station Joint Reserve Base Willow Grove, Pennsylvania.

=== MATCU-74 ===
MATCU-74 was commissioned at Marine Corps Air Station Tustin, California in 1968 to provide training for those Marines assigned as replacements for units in Vietnam. On 15 July 1971 MATCU-74 was transferred from Marine Aircraft Group 56 to Marine Aircraft Group 16 when MAG-56 was decommissioned. MATCU-74 conducted more than 30,000 ground controlled approaches in support of MAG-16. The unit was decommissioned on 27 April 1976 and its personnel and equipment formed part of the newly established Marine Air Traffic Control Squadron 38.

=== MATCU-75 ===
Commissioned in 1968, MATCU-75 was based out of Marine Corps Air Station Camp Pendleton, California as a sub-unit of Marine Aircraft Group 56. On 15 July 1971, MATCU-75 was transferred from MAG-56 to Marine Aircraft Group 16 (MAG-16) when MAG-56 was decommissioned. The unit moved to MCAS Tustin in July 1973 for consolidation with MATCU-67 & 74. MATCU-75 was decommissioned on 27 April 1976 and it personnel and equipment became part of the newly formed Marine Air Traffic Control Squadron 38.

=== MATCU-76 ===
Reserve MATCU based out of Naval Air Station South Weymouth, Massachusetts.

=== MATCU-77 ===
MATCU-77 was commissioned on 30 June 1969 at Marine Corps Air Station El Toro, California. MATCU-77 was decommissioned on 30 September 1971.

=== MATCU-78 ===
MATCU-78 was commissioned on 30 June 1969 at Marine Corps Air Station New River, North Carolina. MATCU-78 was decommissioned on 15 January 1972.

== See also ==
- Marine Corps Aviation
- List of United States Marine Corps aviation support units
