= Marine Aviation Logistics Squadron 36 =

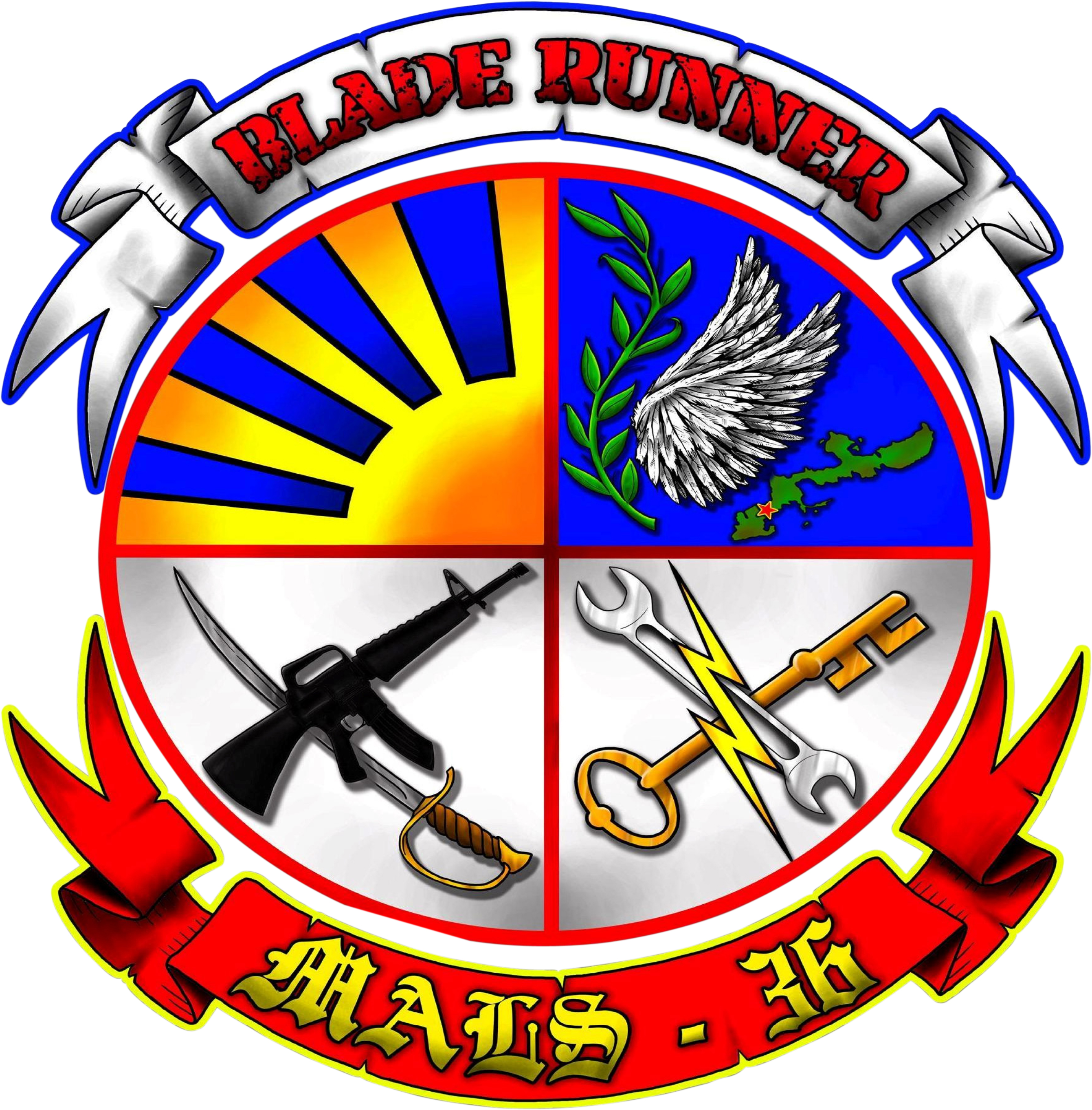
- MALS-36 Unit Insignia
- Active: June 1952 – present
- Country: United States
- Allegiance: United States of America
- Branch: United States Marine Corps
- Type: Logistics
- Role: Aviation logistics support
- Part of: Marine Aircraft Group 36; 1st Marine Aircraft Wing
- Garrison/HQ: Marine Corps Air Station Futenma
- Nickname: "Bladerunner"
- Engagements: Vietnam War; Operation Enduring Freedom

Commanders
- Current commander: LtCol Josh Onuska

Marine Aviation Logistics Squadron 36 (MALS-36) is an aviation logistics support unit of the United States Marine Corps. Nicknamed Bladerunner, they are currently based at Marine Corps Air Station Futenma, Okinawa, Japan and fall under the command of Marine Aircraft Group 36 (MAG-36) and the 1st Marine Aircraft Wing (1st MAW).

== Mission ==
Provide aviation logistics support guidance, and direction to Marine Aircraft Group (MAG) squadrons on behalf of the Commanding Officer; as well as logistics support for Navy-funded equipment in the supporting Marine Wing Support Squadron (MWSS), Marine Air Control Squadron (MACS), and Marine Aircraft Wing/Mobile Calibration Complex (MAW/MCC).

4 means of accomplishing this mission are:

- Provide intermediate level maintenance for aircraft and aeronautical equipment of all supported units and, when authorized, perform first-degree repair on specific engines.
- Provide aviation supply support for aircraft and Navy-funded equipment to all supported units.
- Provide Class V(a) ammunition logistics support to the MAG's squadrons. This support encompasses the requisitioning, storage, handling, assembly, transportation, and inventory reporting of Class V(a) ammunition. Be capable of planning for, and operating, an airfield ammunition issue point at expeditionary airfields.
- Interpret, implement, audit, inspect, and provide oversight for the MAG, CO, of all policies and procedures relating to the administration and management of operations and maintenance, Navy (less TAD) funds, aviation supply, and aircraft.

== History ==
=== Early history ===
Squadron was established in June 1952 at Marine Corps Air Station Tustin, California, as Headquarters Squadron 36, and assigned to Marine Aircraft Group 36, Air Fleet Marine Force, Pacific. Redesignated 15 February 1954 as Headquarters and Maintenance Squadron 36.

=== Vietnam War ===
Deployed during August 1965 to Chu Lai, Republic of Vietnam, and reassigned to the 1st Marine Aircraft Wing. Participated in the Vietnam War from September 1965 through November 1969, operating from Kỳ Hà and Phu Bai. They redeployed during November 1969 to Marine Corps Air Station Futenma, Okinawa.

=== Post Vietnam and the 1990s ===
The squadron was redesignated 1 October 1988 as Marine Aviation Logistics Squadron 36. Since then they have participated in Operation Fiery Vigil, Philippines, June 1991; Operation Restore Hope, Somalia, December 1992 – May 1993 and Operation Stabilize, East Timor, September – November 1999 and January 2000.

=== Global War on Terror ===
In January 2007, a detachment of Marines from MALS-36 attached to HMM-262 and deployed to Iraq in support of Operation Iraqi Freedom.

=== Community involvement ===
The Marines and Sailors of MALS-36 participate in numerous community involvement activities every year. The activities range from cleaning nursing homes in the Okinawan community to picking up trash on the beautiful beaches of Okinawa. Most participants are young Marines and Sailors, unselfishly dedicating their own free time to bettering the community and building a stronger relationship within the Japanese community.

2020 Marine Corps Aviation Association MALS of the Year

== See also ==
- United States Marine Corps Aviation
- Organization of the United States Marine Corps
- List of United States Marine Corps aviation support units
