= Chu Lai Base Area =

U.S. Military base in Vietnam, used during the Vietnam War

Chu Lai Base Area (Kỳ Hà Marine Air Facility) (Chu Lai Air Base)
- Chu Lai, Quảng Nam Province in Vietnam
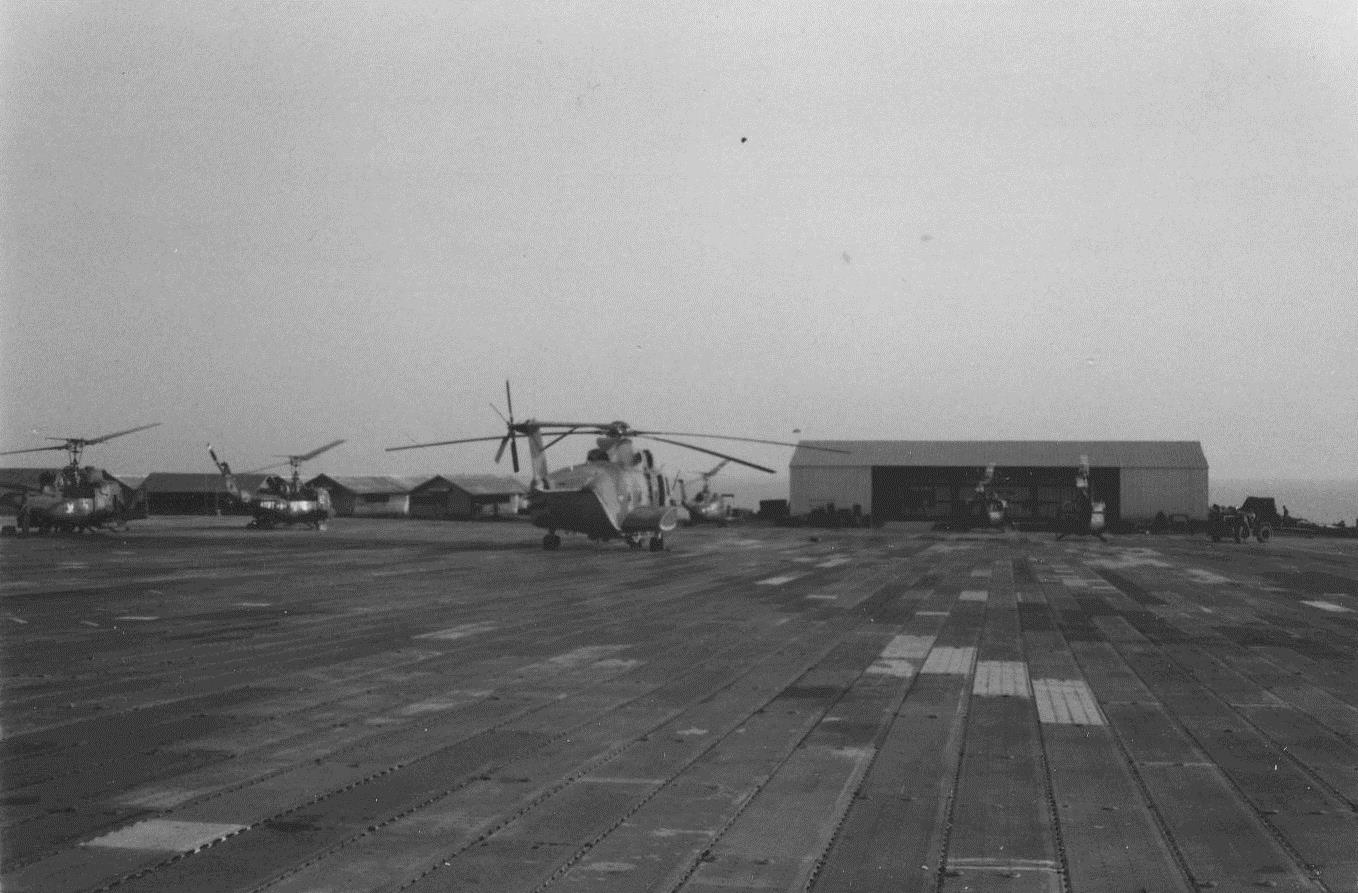

Site information
- Type: Marine/Army base
- Operator: Army of the Republic of Vietnam (ARVN); United States Marine Corps; United States Army (U.S. Army)

Location
- Coordinates: 15.455°N 108.69°E

Site history
- Built: 1965
- Built by: 30th Naval Construction Regiment
- In use: 1965-1972
- Battles/wars: Vietnam War; Operation Starlite

Garrison information
- Garrison: 3rd Marine Division; 1st Marine Division; Task Force Oregon; 23rd Americal Division

Airfield information
- Elevation: 1,759 feet (536 m) AMSL
Helipads
Number	Length and surface
Kỳ Hà 03/21	660 feet (201 m) AM2 Marston Mat

Chu Lai Base Area (also known as Chu Lai Combat Base or simply Chu Lai or Kỳ Hà) is a former U.S. Marine Corps, U.S. Army and Army of the Republic of Vietnam (ARVN) base in Chu Lai in central Vietnam.

Kỳ Hà Air Facility was part of the installation and was located in the northern half, Chu Lai Air Base was part of the installation and was located to the south-east.

== History ==
=== 1965 ===
The base was located on the Kỳ Hà peninsula north of Highway 1 approximately 60 kilometres (37 mi) southeast of Da Nang.

On 6 May units from the ARVN 2nd Division and 3rd Battalion, 9th Marines secured the Chu Lai area. On 7 May, the 3rd Marine Expeditionary Brigade (3rd MEB), composed of the 4th Marine Regiment, 3rd Reconnaissance Battalion, elements of Marine Aircraft Group 12 (MAG-12) and Naval Mobile Construction Battalion 10 landed at Chu Lai to establish a jet-capable airfield and base area.

The Marines provided security for the Seabees as they constructed the airbase. By mid-June the 3rd Battalion, 12th Marines had arrived at Chu Lai to provide artillery support for the 4th Marines and the Marines were authorised to conduct search and destroy operations within a 104 square mile tactical area of operations.

In August 3rd Battalion, 11th Marines and the 3rd 155mm Gun Battery arrived at Chu Lai. On 14 August the 7th Marine Regiment arrived at Chu Lai. On 18 August the Marines launched Operation Starlite to secure the area around Chu Lai, the operation lasted until 24 August and resulted in 45 Marines and 614 Viet Cong killed.

On 2 September Marine Aircraft Group 36 (MAG-36) was established at Kỳ Hà, comprising:

- HMM-362
- HMM-363 (from December)
- HMM-364
- H&MS-36
- VMO-6

Also in September the 2nd Light Anti-Aircraft Missile Battalion equipped with HAWK missiles was deployed to Chu Lai to defend the air base and base area.

In November 3rd Battalion, 3rd Marines was moved from Chu Lai to Danang. By the end of 5 December Marine Battalions from the 4th and 7th Marine Regiments were based at Chu Lai.

When initially established the air base and base area were supplied by LSTs coming from Danang and landing at an LST ramp built on the sheltered side of the Kỳ Hà Peninsula. A Force Logistic Support Unit was established on the Kỳ Hà Peninsula to control the logistics flow.

=== 1966 ===
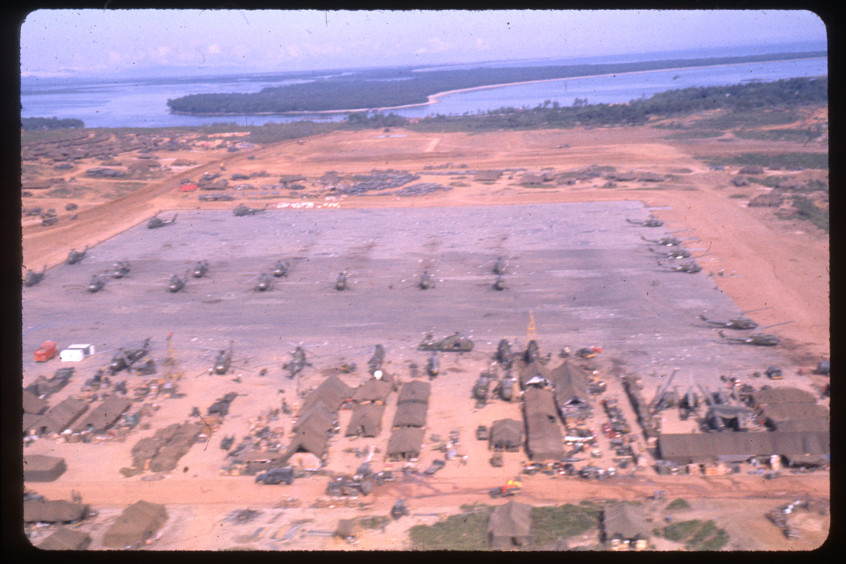
MAG-36 helicopter landing pads, 1965

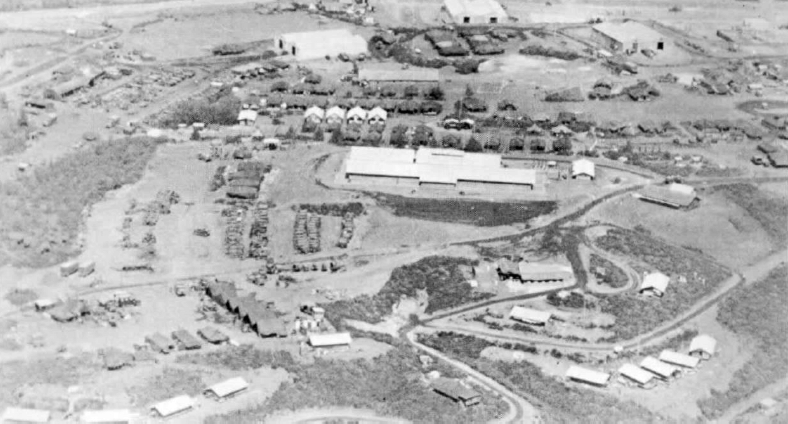
Force Logistics Support Group Bravo

On 17 January the 1st Marine Regiment established its headquarters at Chu Lai and later took operational control of the two battalions of the 4th Marines. In late January the Marine infantry and helicopters at Chu Lai participated in Operation Double Eagle On 27 February while several Battalions were absent on Operation Double Eagle the Vietcong attacked a 1/4 Marines outpost killing 5 Marines.

From 4–7 March the Chu Lai-based Marines and ARVN 2nd Division launched Operation Utah resulting in 98 Marines, 30 ARVN and almost 600 People's Army of Vietnam (PAVN) soldiers killed and 5 captured. From 20 to 27 March the 3/7 Marines and ARVN 5th Airborne Battalion launched Operation Texas resulting in 99 Marines and 283 PAVN/Vietcong killed. On 28 March the 1/7 Marines launched Operation Indiana to assist the 3rd Battalion, 5th ARVN Regiment resulting in 11 Marines and 169 Vietcong killed.

On 28 March 4 Marines moved their headquarters from Chu Lai to Phu Bai Combat Base The 3/12 Marines also moved to Phu Bai in March and artillery support was taken over by the 11th Marines.

On 29 March the 1st Marine Division established its headquarters at Chu Lai. The 1st Division commander MGEN Lewis Fields created the Chu Lai Defense Command tasked with protecting the air base and the Kỳ Hà Peninsula.

Also in March the Force Logistics Support Unit became Force Logistics Support Group Bravo and Naval Mobile Construction Battalion 4 began building permanent facilities at Kỳ Hà.

In mid-April the 2nd Battalion, 5th Marines replaced the 2/4 Marines which moved north to Danang. On 22 May 1st Battalion, 5th Marines replaced the 3/1 Marines which also moved to Danang. On 27 May the 5th Marine Regiment moved its headquarters to Chu Lai. By 1 June Marine Division had over 17,000 men in the expanded 340 square mile tactical area of operations around Chu Lai.

From 17 to 22 June 1 Marine Division launched Operation Kansas in the Que Son Valley resulting in 9 Marines and 85 PAVN killed. From 6–14 July the Marines 1st Reconnaissance Battalion launched Operation Washington in the Do Xa region west of Chu Lai, resulting in 15 Vietcong killed and 8 captured. From 6–22 August the Marines and ARVN launched Operation Colorado/Lien Ket 52 to engage the PAVN 2nd Division in the Que Son Valley.

On 18 August the Republic of Korea 2nd Marine Brigade was deployed to Chu Lai and assigned an area of operations southeast of Chu lai, including the Batangan Peninsula.

On 10 October 1 Marine Division headquarters was moved from Chu Lai to Danang, replacing the 3rd Marine Division rear headquarters which moved from Danang to Đông Hà.

In October Battery A, 2nd Battalion, 18th Artillery was deployed to Chu Lai to support the Marine artillery. On 30 November the 1st Field Artillery Group was deployed to Chu Lai to assume control of all artillery from the 11th Marines which had moved north to Danang.

Units attached to MAG-36 at Kỳ Hà during this period included:

- HMM-165 (from September)
- HMM-261 (until April)
- HMM-262 (from December)
- HMM-361 (June, August)
- HMM-362 (April–August)
- HMM-363 (until July)
- HMM-364 (until March, July–October)
- H&MS-16 sub-unit one (January 1966)
- VMO-6

=== 1967 ===
From 21 April to 16 May the Marines launched Operation Union near the Que Son Valley resulting in 110 Marines and 865 PAVN/Vietcong killed.

In early April Military Assistance Command, Vietnam (MACV) gave instructions to commence the Task Force Oregon plan, which involved the movement of an Army task force to Đức Phổ and Chu Lai area to allow the 1st Marine Division to move north to Danang to support the 3rd Marine Division in northern I Corps. Task Force Oregon comprised:

- 3rd Brigade, 25th Infantry Division
- 1st Brigade, 101st Airborne Division
- 196th Light Infantry Brigade
- 2nd Squadron, 11th Armored Cavalry (May–August 1967)

On 9 April the 196th Light Infantry Brigade arrived at Chu Lai, the Task Force headquarters was activated on 12 April, by 17 April the 196th had commenced Operation Lawrence west of the air base and by 26 April the Task Force had assumed control of the Chu Lai tactical area of operations.

From August–September Task Force Oregon launched Operation Benton to the west of Chu Lai, resulting in 397 PAVN killed.

In September 1967 the 23rd Infantry Division was reestablished from elements of Task Force Oregon with its headquarters at Chu Lai and would remain here until November 1971, its subordinate units based at Chu Lai were:

- 1st Squadron, 1st Cavalry (September 1967 – November 1968, November 1969 – August 1970, November 1970 – April 1971)
- 11th Infantry Brigade
- 196th Light Infantry Brigade (June–October 1967, July 1968 – March 1971)
- 198th Infantry Brigade (December 1967 – November 1971)
- 3rd Battalion, 16th Artillery (June 1967 – October 1971)
- 3rd Battalion, 18th Artillery (April 1967 – October 1971)
- Battery G, 55th Artillery (February 1968 – July 1971)
- 6th Battalion, 56th Artillery (1968 – June 1969)
- 1st Battalion, 82nd Artillery (July 1968 – November 1971)
- 3rd Battalion, 82nd Artillery (February 1969)
- 16th Aviation Group (March 1969 – November 1971) including:
  - 14th Aviation Battalion (April 1967 – October 1971)
  - 123rd Aviation Battalion (December 1967 – November 1971)
  - 21st Aviation Company (June 1967 – November 1971)
  - 71st Aviation Company (September 1967 – October 1971)
- 28th Engineer Battalion (December 1967 – November 1971)
- 509th Signal Battalion (1967–68)
- 523rd Signal Battalion (January 1968 – November 1971)
- 74th Medical Battalion (October 1967 – November 1969)
- 27th Surgical Hospital (March 1968 – June 1971)
- 91st Evacuation Hospital (July 1969 – November 1971)

Units attached to MAG-36 at Kỳ Hà during this period included:

- HMM-165 (until November)
- HMM-263 (from July–November)
- HMM-262 (until March)
- HMM-362 (until June)
- HMM-363 (January)
- VMO-6 (until September)

In October MAG-36 began to relocate from Kỳ Hà to Phu Bai and by the end of the month most units had completed the move.

The 3rd Brigade, 1st Cavalry Division was based at Chu Lai from October 1967 – January 1968, constituent units included:

- 1st Battalion, 7th Cavalry (January 1968)
- 2nd Battalion, 7th Cavalry
- 2nd Battalion, 12th Cavalry (October 1967 – January 1968)

In late 1967 Force Logistics Group Bravo moved from Chu Lai to Đông Hà, leaving only a reinforced supply company to handle logistics for the remaining Marines at Chu Lai.

In 1967 a Naval Support Activity base was established at Chu Lai to provide logistics support for allied operations in southern I Corps.

=== 1968–71 ===
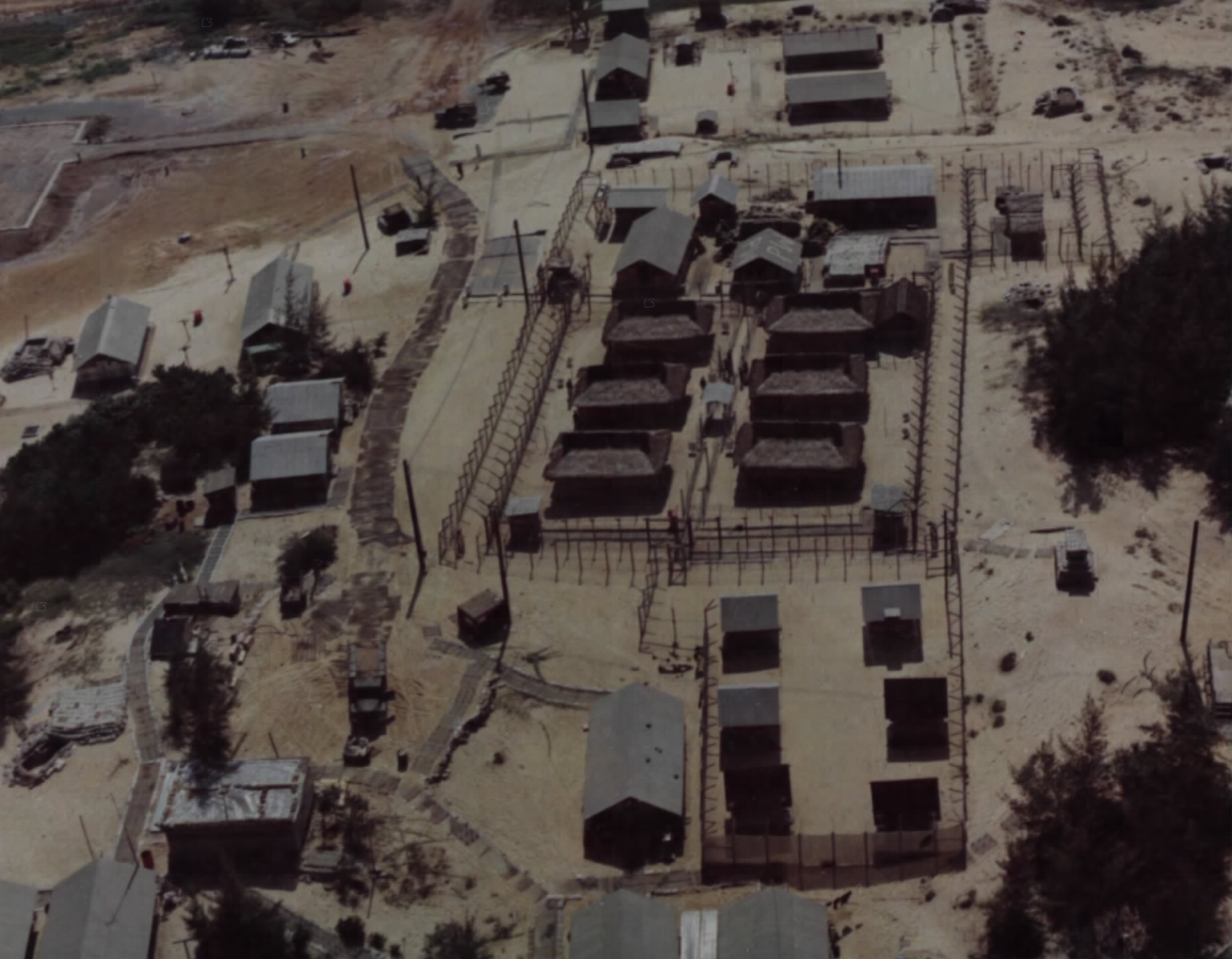
Chu Lai PW Collection camp, 1 November 1968

On 31 January 1968 as part of the Tet Offensive Vietcong rockets hit the FLSG Bravo ammunition dump destroying over 600 tons of bombs and bulk explosives.

In September 1968 the 2nd Light Anti-Aircraft Missile Battalion returned to the U.S.

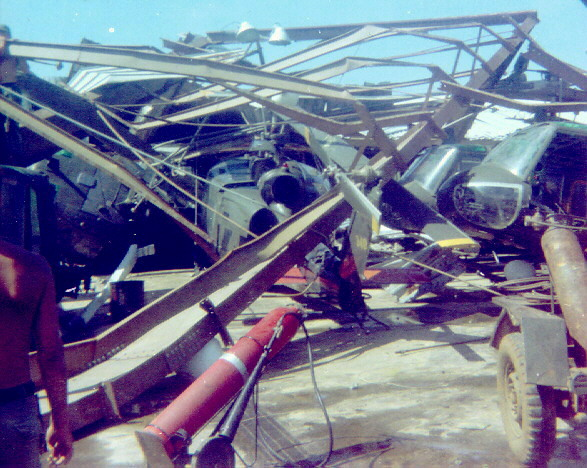
Damaged hangar of the 174th Assault Helicopter Company at Chu Lai after Typhoon Hester

On 23 October 1971 the base was severely damaged by Typhoon Hester which damaged or destroyed 75 percent of the structures in the base. Sustained winds and gusts in the base were estimated to have reached 130 km/h (80 mph) and 160 km/h (105 mph) respectively. Four hangars collapsed, with total aircraft losses amounting to 36 destroyed and 87 damaged. The 91st Evacuation Hospital was mostly destroyed and was forced to transfer patients to Qui Nhơn.

On 27 November 1971 the 23rd Infantry Division turned over the base to the ARVN.

== Current use ==
Satellite imagery shows that the base has been turned over to housing and farmland, while the port facilities remain in use.
