= Typhoon Hester (1971) =

Pacific typhoon in 1971

Typhoon Hester (Goying)
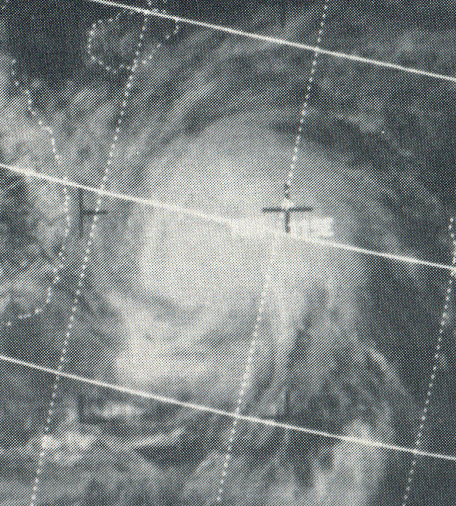
- Typhoon Hester intensifying over the South China Sea on October 22

Meteorological history
- Formed: October 18, 1971
- Dissipated: October 24, 1971

Typhoon
- 10-minute sustained (JMA)
- Lowest pressure: 970 hPa (mbar); 28.64 inHg

Category 2-equivalent typhoon
- 1-minute sustained (SSHWS/JTWC)
- Highest winds: 165 km/h (105 mph)
- Lowest pressure: 967 hPa (mbar); 28.56 inHg

Overall effects
- Fatalities: 119 total
- Missing: 2
- Damage: ≥$3.6 million (1971 USD)
- Areas affected: Philippines, North Vietnam, South Vietnam Laos
- IBTrACS
- Part of the 1971 Pacific typhoon season

Typhoon Hester, known in the Philippines as Typhoon Goying, was regarded as one of the most destructive storms to strike Vietnam since 1944. Developing as a tropical depression on October 18 near Palau, Hester gradually intensified as it moved westward towards the Philippines. Across the Philippines, Hester was responsible for six deaths and ₱5 million in damage. After passing over Mindanao and the Visayas as a tropical storm between October 20 and 21, the storm intensified into a typhoon before striking Palawan. Once over the South China Sea, Hester further strengthened and ultimately attained peak winds of 165 km/h (105 mph). On October 23, the storm made landfall near Huế, South Vietnam. Once onshore, Hester rapidly weakened and dissipated on October 24 over Laos.

The most significant impact from Typhoon Hester was felt in South Vietnam, where winds in excess of 155 km/h (95 mph) caused extensive damage to several United States Army bases. The hardest hit base was in Chu Lai where three Americans were killed. At least 75 percent of the structures in the base sustained damage and 123 aircraft were damaged or destroyed. Newspaper reports indicated that 100 Vietnamese lost their lives due to the storm, including 33 following a plane crash near Quy Nhơn. In the wake of the storm, the South Vietnamese government provided the hardest hit areas with relief funds and supplies.

== Meteorological history ==
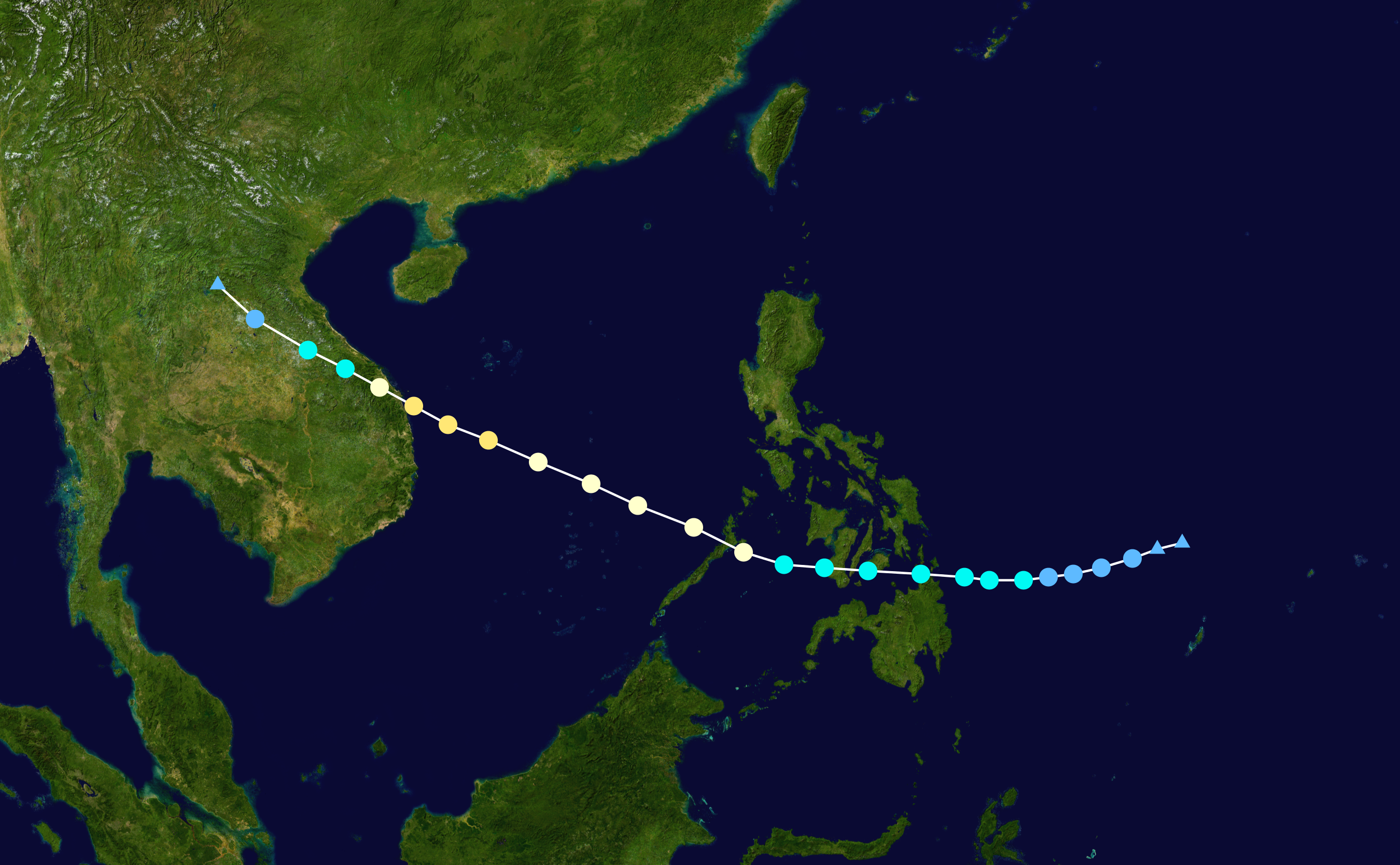
Map plotting the storm's track and intensity, according to the Saffir–Simpson scale Map key Saffir–Simpson scale Tropical depression (≤38 mph, ≤62 km/h) Tropical storm (39–73 mph, 63–118 km/h) Category 1 (74–95 mph, 119–153 km/h) Category 2 (96–110 mph, 154–177 km/h) Category 3 (111–129 mph, 178–208 km/h) Category 4 (130–156 mph, 209–251 km/h) Category 5 (≥157 mph, ≥252 km/h) Unknown Storm type Tropical cyclone Subtropical cyclone Extratropical cyclone, remnant low, tropical disturbance, or monsoon depression

On October 18, a tropical depression formed just west of Palau. Tracking westward, the system attained tropical storm-force winds the following day and was assigned the name Hester. At this time, Hester was located approximately 400 km (250 mi) east of northern Mindanao in the Philippines. Due to the cyclone's proximity to the country, the Philippine Atmospheric, Geophysical and Astronomical Services Administration also monitored the storm and assigned it with the local name Goying. Early on October 20, Hester brushed northern Mindanao before crossing the Visayas. The storm passed approximately 75 km (45 mi) south of Cebu City later that day before moving into the South China Sea. Early on October 21, Hester intensified into a typhoon hours before crossing Palawan.

Once over the South China Sea, a strong ridge built over southern China resulting in Hester turning northwestward and accelerating. It reached a forward speed of 33 km/h (20 mph), twice the climatological average for typhoons in that region during October. Between October 22 and 23, the storm developed an eye before reaching its peak intensity as a Category 2-equivalent typhoon. The Joint Typhoon Warning Center estimated peak winds to have reached 165 km/h (105 mph) along with a central pressure of 967 mb (hPa; 28.56 inHg). Hester subsequently made landfall near Huế, South Vietnam. Once onshore, the storm's structure rapidly degraded as it weakened. The storm later dissipated over central Laos on October 24.

== Impact and aftermath ==
=== South Vietnam ===
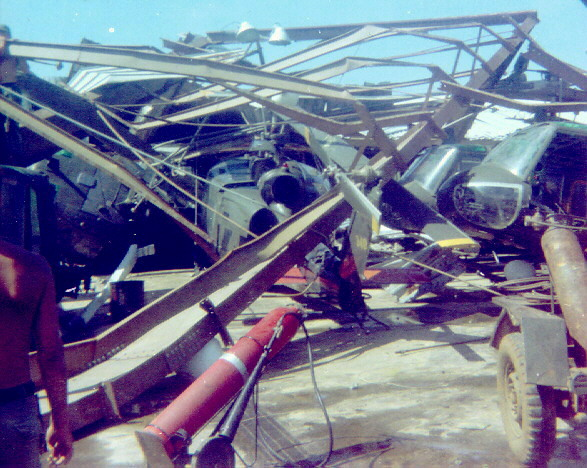
The hangar of the 174th Assault Helicopter Company in Chu Lai was leveled along with about twelve Dolphin Huey helicopters.

Regarded as one of the most destructive storms to strike Vietnam since 1944, Typhoon Hester caused considerable damage in the country and disrupted the Vietnam War. Making landfall directly over the United States military installation in Chu Lai, Hester damaged or destroyed 75 percent of the structures in the base. Sustained winds and gusts in the base were estimated to have reached 130 km/h (80 mph) and 160 km/h (100 mph) respectively. Four hangars collapsed in the Chu Lai airbase, with total aircraft losses amounting to 36 destroyed and 87 damaged. Losses from the destroyed helicopters exceeded $3.6 million (1971 USD). Dozens of barracks were damaged in Chu Lai and communications were hampered. The 91st Evacuation Hospital was mostly destroyed and was forced to transfer patients to Quy Nhơn. Nearly 50 percent of the structures at the Marble Mountain Air Facility were damaged by the storm's high winds.

Heavy rains accompanying the storm, peaking at 5.44 in (138 mm) at Camp Eagle, caused considerable flooding in the country. Approximately 370 km (230 mi) of coastline between Quảng Trị and Đà Nẵng were inundated. About 90 percent of homes in Đà Nẵng were damaged. Flooding from the storm washed out a bridge between Fire Support Base Birmingham and Camp Eagle, temporarily isolating two units within the 94th Field Artillery Regiment.

Extensive losses to agriculture also took place, with major crop losses reported and 900 cattle killed. According to government officials, the entire banana, rice, and sugar cane crop was destroyed and harvests could not be made until the following spring. Offshore, nearly 500 vessels sank or were destroyed by the storm and the 1,000 ton Union Pacific ran aground.

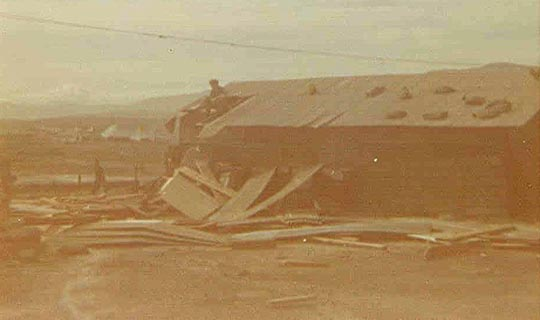
Damage to a barracks in Camp Evans

According to newspaper reports, 100 Vietnamese perished during Hester. Thirty-three fatalities took place after a Republic of Vietnam Air Force transport crashed near Quy Nhơn. Three Americans were killed due to flying debris during the storm and twenty-one others were injured. On October 25, thunderstorms associated with Hester were blamed on a helicopter crash Nha Trang that killed ten Americans. Roughly 550,000 homes were destroyed across the country, leaving an estimated 200,000 people homeless.

On October 25, Premier Tran Thien Khiem toured some of the storm-ravaged areas and made on-the-spot grants of $19,000 to each province and $3,500 to Đà Nẵng. He also promised that 50,000 sheets of tin roofing would be sent to aid in reconstruction. Later that day, President Nguyen Van Thieu ordered $725,000 be made available for disaster relief in the northern provinces following an emergency meeting. The Social Welfare Ministry estimated that $1.5 million would be needed for civilian relief.

=== Elsewhere ===
Tracking over the southern Philippines as a tropical storm, Hester caused some damage in the country. Winds of 95 km/h (60 mph) were reported in Cebu City as the storm passed by. A total of six people were killed while twenty-two sustained injuries and another two were reported missing. Damage amounted to ₱5 million. In North Vietnam, the Viet Cong was reportedly taking "urgent measures" to cope with the aftermath of the typhoon. A Chinese news broadcast stated that 100 million piastres had been allocated for relief efforts.

== See also ==
- 1971 Pacific typhoon season
- Vietnam War
- Typhoon Tembin
- Typhoon Molave
