= Headquarters and Headquarters Squadron =

Type of U.S. Marine Corps unit

A Headquarters and Headquarters Squadron, abbreviated as HHS or HQHQSQDN, is the headquarters entity for a United States Marine Corps aviation facility.

== Organization ==
A H&HS usually consists of the headquarters group (the station commanding general or officer), the squadron headquarters (commanding officer and his staff), public affairs and journalism, facilities planning & maintenance, a motor pool, air traffic control, meteorology, fuels, ordnance, other aviation support, Aircraft Rescue and Firefighting, a Provost Marshal, the Station Judge Advocate's Office, some sort of United States Navy medical facility, and Marine Corps Community Services, which usually host services like a post exchange, a commissary, gas stations, barber shops, library, movie theater, family services, Single Marine Program, and the like.

Most Marine Corps Operational Support Airlift (OSA) assets and aircraft are attached to the H&HS at an air station or base rather than using the standard squadron-group-wing command structure of most other Marine Corps aviation units. The primary military occupational specialty (MOS) of an OSA aviator is to manage airfield operations; flying OSA aircraft is strictly a secondary MOS.

== List of H&HSs ==
Insignia	Station	Location
	Marine Corps Air Station Cherry Point	Havelock, North Carolina
	Marine Corps Air Station New River	Jacksonville, North Carolina
	Marine Corps Air Station Beaufort	Beaufort, South Carolina
	Marine Corps Air Facility Quantico	Triangle, Virginia
	Marine Corps Air Station Miramar	San Diego, California
	Marine Corps Air Station Yuma	Yuma, Arizona
	Marine Corps Air Station Camp Pendleton	Oceanside, California
	Marine Corps Air Station Iwakuni	Iwakuni, Japan
	Marine Corps Air Station Futenma	Ginowan, Okinawa, Japan

== See also ==
- List of United States Marine Corps installations
- United States Marine Corps aviation
- List of active United States Marine Corps aircraft squadrons
- List of inactive United States Marine Corps aircraft squadrons
- List of United States Marine Corps aviation support units
