= Firebase Pedro =

Former U.S. Army base

Site information
- Type: Army/Marines

Location
- Coordinates: 16.71°N 107.106°E

Site history
- Built: 1968
- In use: 1968–1972
- Battles/wars: Vietnam War; Easter Offensive

Garrison information
- Occupants: Vietnamese Marine Corps

Firebase Pedro (also known as Landing Zone Pedro) is a former U.S. Army and Army of the Republic of Vietnam (ARVN) firebase southwest of Quảng Trị in central Vietnam.

== History ==
The base was established on Route 557 approximately 5 km southwest of the Quảng Trị.

Landing Zone Pedro was first established by the 5th Battalion, 7th Cavalry Regiment in January 1968 for use during Operation Pegasus.

=== 1972 ===
By January 1972 the ARVN 3rd Division had assumed responsibility for the area north of Highway 9. Pedro was occupied by the Vietnamese Marine Corps (VNMC) 1st Marine Battalion.

The PAVN launched their Easter Offensive on 30 March 1972 and PAVN artillery fire hit all the ARVN and Marine positions along the DMZ. On 5 April the VNMC 1st Battalion was withdrawn to Ái Tử Combat Base and replaced with the VNMC 6th battalion. At dawn on 9 April the PAVN launched an attack, led by tanks, against Pedro. The PAVN tanks had outrun their infantry support and 9 tanks were lost in a minefield around Pedro. An armored task force of 8 M48s and 12 M113s from the ARVN 20th Tank Battalion were despatched from Ái Tử to support the Marines at Pedro. At the same time a flight of Vietnamese Air Force Douglas A-1 Skyraiders arrived overhead and destroyed 5 tanks. When the ARVN armor arrived they destroyed five T-54s for no losses and drove one captured T-54 back to Ái Tử. On 10 and 11 April further PAVN attacks on Pedro were repulsed at a cost of over 200 PAVN estimated killed.

At 02:00 on 29 April the PAVN attacked the ARVN positions north and south of Ái Tử and the ARVN defenses began to crumble. By midday on 30 April, the 3rd Division commander ordered a withdrawal from Ái Tử to a defensive line along the south of the Thạch Hãn River and the withdrawal was completed late that day.

== Current use ==
The base has reverted to jungle.
