= Quảng Trị Combat Base =

Site information
- Type: Marines/Army

Location
- Coordinates: 16.775°N 107.161°E

Site history
- Built: 1967
- In use: 1967–1975
- Battles/wars: Vietnam War; Battle of Quang Tri; First Battle of Quảng Trị; Second Battle of Quảng Trị

Garrison information
- Occupants: 3rd Marine Division; 1st Brigade, 5th Infantry Division (Mechanized) (U.S. Army); ARVN 1st Division; ARVN 3rd Division

Airfield information
- IATA: none; ICAO: none

Summary
- Elevation AMSL: 36 ft (11 m)

Runways
Direction	Length		Surface
Direction	ft	m	Surface
	3,500	1,067	PSP

Quảng Trị Combat Base (also known as Ái Tử Combat Base or simply Quảng Trị) is a former United States Marine Corps, United States Army and Army of the Republic of Vietnam (ARVN) base northwest of Quảng Trị in central Vietnam.

== History ==
=== 1967 ===
The base was located on Highway 1 approximately 8 km northwest of Quảng Trị and 8 km southeast of Đông Hà beside the Thạch Hãn River.

Following a series of artillery and rocket attacks on Đông Hà Combat Base, the Marines' major logistics and aviation support base in northern Quảng Trị Province, throughout the year, the Marines decided that Đông Hà was too vulnerable to PAVN artillery and rockets located north of the Vietnamese Demilitarized Zone (DMZ) and decided to establish a new logistics base out of range closer to Quảng Trị City. In September 1967 the Seabees began construction of an airfield and new base area and the first aircraft landed at the airfield on 23 October.

In October the 1st Marines was moved from Danang to Quảng Trị. The Marines then launched Operation Osceola to provide security around the Quảng Trị base, the 2nd Battalion, 1st Marines and 2nd Battalion, 4th Marines supporting by artillery from the 1st Battalion, 11th Marines conducted a pacification and anti-mining campaign around the base.

In December Marine Aircraft Group 36 (MAG-36) forward was established at Quảng Trị, comprising:

- HMM-163
- VMO-6

=== 1968 ===
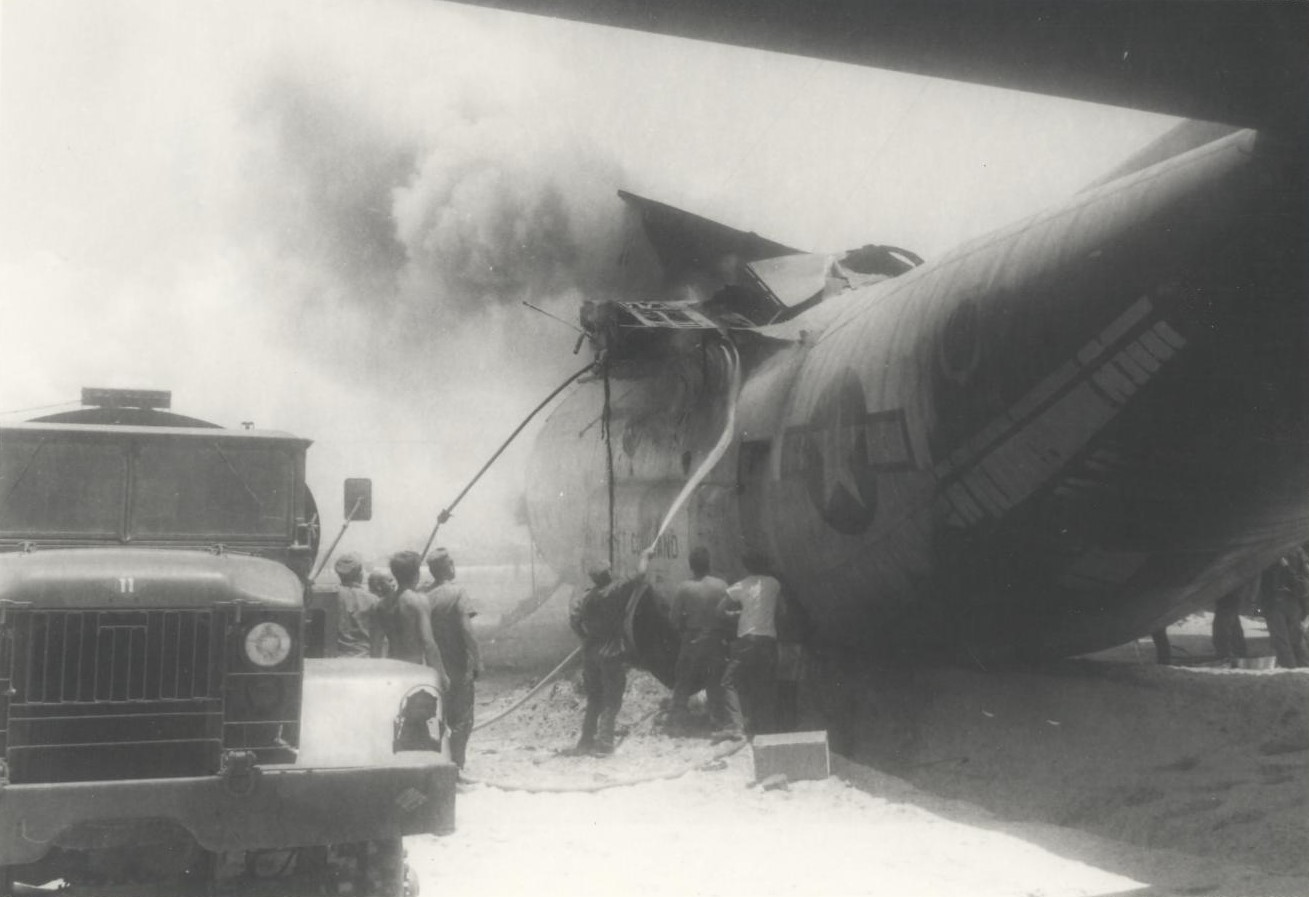
Marines extinguish a burning C-130 at Quang Tri Combat Base, 24 May 1968

Operation Osceola ended on 20 January, total casualties were 17 Marines and 76 PAVN killed. Also on 20 January the 3rd Marines replaced the 1st Marines at Quảng Trị. Operation Osceola II commenced on 20 January with 1st Battalion, 3rd Marines responsible for protecting the base supported by artillery from 3rd Battalion, 12th Marines. On 24 and 31 January the base was hit by 122 mm rockets and mortar fire causing minimal damage.

On 31 January at the opening of the Tet Offensive the PAVN and Vietcong launched attacks on U.S. forces around Quảng Trị City and the PAVN 812th Regiment launched an attack on the city itself. As the Marines had only one battalion at the base they remained to defend the base while the recently arrived 1st Cavalry Division south of the city was sent to reinforce the ARVN 1st Regiment 1st Division defending the city. By 1 February the PAVN/Vietcong were in retreat having lost over 900 killed.

On 16 February, the 1st Brigade, 1st Cavalry Division assumed responsibility for the Operation Osceola II area and operational control of 1/3 Marines, with the Marines only responsible for point defense of the base. On 18 April following the completion of Operation Pegasus the 26th Marines moved from Khe Sanh Combat Base to Quảng Trị.

On 27 October, Marine Air Support Squadron 2 (MASS-2) established an Air Support Radar Team (ASRT) at QuangTri. This detachment utilized the AN/TPQ-10 Course Directing Radar Central to provide aerial delivered fires in all weather conditions both day and night. On 3 November responsibility for ASRT operations was transferred to Marine Air Support Squadron 3 (MASS-3) as MASS-2 prepared to leave Vietnam. In 1969 the Quang Tri ASRT was operational for 1,526 hours controlling 717 sorties of aircraft and responsible for the employment of 1,754.449 short tons of ordnance.

On 1 November, the 1st Brigade, 5th Infantry Division assumed responsibility for security in northern Quảng Trị Province.

MAG-36 units stationed at Quảng Trị during this period included:

- HMM-163
- HMM-262
- VMO-6

In April 1968 Provisional Marine Aircraft Group 39 (MAG-39) was formed at Quảng Trị, units assigned included:

- HMM-161 (from May 1968)
- HMM-163 (until end of April 1968)
- HMM-262
- VMO-6
- MATCU-66 (15 Apr-10 Oct 1968)

MAG-36 remained at Quảng Trị until September 1969.

=== 1969 ===
On 23 April 1969, the base was the scene of one of the first reported Fragging incidents of the war when 1LT Robert T. Rohweller of the 3rd Battalion, 9th Marines was killed by a grenade thrown into his hut.

The base was used as a staging area as the Marines withdrew from I Corps in June–September 1969. On 23 September MAG-39 began moving to Phu Bai Combat Base, completing the move by 15 October. On 22 October the Marines handed over control of their tactical area of operations (including the base) to the 1st Brigade, 5th Infantry Division and the ARVN 1st Division.

=== 1970–1971 ===
On 30 January 1971 the U.S. XXIV Corps forward headquarters was established at the base to support Operation Dewey Canyon II.

On 8 May 1971 the MASS-3 Air Support Radar Team equipped with the AN-TPQ-10 radar system ceased operations at Quang Tri. During its approximately 20 months at Quang Tri the ASRT was operational for 12,032 hours, controlling 3,411 sorties against 2,942 targets and responsible for the employment of approximately 8,957 short tons of ordnance (17.9 million lbs of ordnance).

=== 1972 ===
By January 1972 the ARVN 3rd Division was responsible for the base, now called Ái Tử Combat Base and had its headquarters there, MACV Advisory Team 155 was also based at Ái Tử.

On 30 March 1972 the PAVN launched the Easter Offensive and at midday artillery fire began to hit the base. On the evening of 1 April, the 3rd Division headquarters was moved to a new position inside Quảng Trị City while the remaining U.S. advisers stayed at Ái Tử to coordinate artillery, naval and air support.

On the early morning of 9 April Ái Tử was hit by PAVN 130mm artillery fire and at dawn the PAVN launched an attack, led by tanks against Firebase Pedro on Route 557 to the west of Ái Tử which was defended by the Vietnamese Marine Corps (VNMC) 6th Marine Battalion. The PAVN tanks had outrun their infantry support and 9 tanks were lost in a minefield around Pedro. An armored task force of 8 M48s and 12 M113s from the ARVN 20th Tank Battalion were despatched from Ái Tử to support the Marines at Pedro. At the same time a flight of Vietnamese Air Force A-1 Skyraiders arrived overhead and destroyed 5 tanks. When the ARVN armor arrived they destroyed 5 54s for no losses and drove 1 captured T-54 back to Ái Tử. On 10 and 11 April further PAVN attacks on Pedro were repulsed at a cost of over 200 PAVN killed.

By late April the direction of the PAVN assault in Quảng Trị Province had moved from Đông Hà in the north to Ái Tử and Quảng Trị city in the west. On 23 April the VNMC Brigade 147 relieved Brigade 258 at Ái Tử. At 06:30 on 27 April the PAVN 304th Division attacked Ái Tử from the southwest, 2 attacks were repulsed but the base's ammunition dump was destroyed by artillery fire. On 28 April the ARVN 20th Tank Battalion was withdrawn from Đông Hà to support the base at Ái Tử, the ARVN 57th Regiment, fearing they were being abandoned, panicked and deserted their positions, leading to the collapse of the ARVN defensive line on the Cua Viet River. The VNMC 7th Battalion was sent to Ái Tử to help defend the base. At 02:00 on 29 April the PAVN attacked the ARVN positions north and south of the base and the ARVN defenses began to crumble, by midday on 30 April, the 3rd Division commander ordered a withdrawal from Ái Tử to a defensive line along the south of the Thạch Hãn River and the withdrawal was completed late that day.

By August 1972 the area around the base was home to numerous PAVN artillery units which were used to bombard the ARVN defenders in Quảng Trị city.In late October the ARVN began attacks north of Quảng Trị to try to regain positions along the south bank of the Cua Viet River. The attacks were met with a stiff PAVN response and were stopped at the Thạch Hãn River. On 27 January in accordance with the provisions of the Paris Peace Accords a ceasefire in place took effect across South Vietnam and the Thạch Hãn River would become part of the de facto border for the next 2 years,

== Current use ==
The base has been turned over to housing and farmland, however the airfield is still clearly visible on satellite images.
