= Marine Aircraft Group 36 =

- MAG-36 insignia
- Active: 2 June 1952 – present
- Country: United States
- Branch: USMC
- Role: Assault support
- Part of: 1st Marine Aircraft Wing; III Marine Expeditionary Force
- Garrison/HQ: Marine Corps Air Station Futenma
- Engagements: Vietnam War; Operation Enduring Freedom

Commanders
- Current commander: Col. Lee W. Hemming
- Notable commanders: Earl E. Anderson

Marine Aircraft Group 36 (MAG-36) is an active air group of the United States Marine Corps, tasked with providing assault support aircraft. It is currently part of the 1st Marine Aircraft Wing (1st MAW), itself an integral part of the III Marine Expeditionary Force, and based at Marine Corps Air Station Futenma in Okinawa, Japan.

== Mission ==
The mission of MAG-36 is to support the Marine Air Ground Task Force (MAGTF) with combat ready expeditionary assault support aircraft and when directed, plan and conduct aviation operations as a Marine Expeditionary Brigade-level Aviation Combat Element.

== Subordinate units ==
- VMM-262
- VMM-265
- MALS-36
- Marine Wing Support Squadron 172

Also attached are Unit Deployment Program (UDP) squadrons, usually Marine Light Attack Helicopter Squadrons flying the UH-1Y and AH-1Z, and Marine Heavy Helicopter Squadrons flying the CH-53E.

== History ==
Originally formed at Marine Corps Air Station El Toro, in Santa Ana, California, on 2 June 1952 as Marine Air Group (Helicopter Transport) 36, the Group spent several years training for amphibious operations to carry out the role of ship-to-shore assault support. At this time, the Group consisted of squadrons HMR-361, HMR-362, HMR-363, all flying HRS-1 helicopters.

In 1959, it was renamed Marine Air Group 36. By 1962 MAG-36 comprised a Headquarters & Maintenance squadron, a Marine Air Base squadron, four light transport squadrons HMRL-163, HMRL-361, HMRL-363 and HMRL-364 and one medium transport squadron, HMRM-462, for a total of 105 helicopters.

=== Vietnam War ===
In 1965 it was attached to the 1st MAW, when it deployed to South Vietnam in August of that year. It sailed for South Vietnam aboard the USS Princeton, flying ashore at Kỳ Hà on 1 September. This was both the first full Marine Air Group to arrive in South Vietnam, and more generally the first time a full helicopter group had been transported this way. By the end of September most of the helicopter units comprising the group had arrived at Kỳ Hà, these included: HMM-362, HMM-364, VMO-6, H&MS-36 and MABS-36, while HMM-363 was at Qui Nhon. The group flew its first missions on 12 September. From 10 to 12 November the group supported Operation Blue Marlin. In mid-November the group supported Marines operations in the Hiệp Đức District. In December the group supported Operation Harvest Moon.

In late January 1966 the group supported Operation Double Eagle. In early March the group supported Operation Utah. Later in March the group supported Operation Texas. In June the group supported Operation Kansas. In early August the group supported Operation Colorado. In October HMM-165 equipped with the new CH-46A Sea Knight joined the group. In December HMM-262 equipped with CH-46As joined the group.

On 4 October 1967 VMO-6 was the first group squadron to move north to Phu Bai Combat Base and by 15 October the group headquarters was operational at Phu Bai. On 16 October the group took control of VMO-3, HMM-164, HMM-362, MATCU-62 and MATCU-68 from Marine Aircraft Group 16 (MAG-16) while control of HMM-265 at Marble Mountain Air Facility was transferred to MAG-16. On 30 October HMM-163 equipped with CH-46's came ashore from USS Okinawa and joined the group at Quảng Trị Combat Base. In late November HMM-165 was the last group squadron to move north from Kỳ Hà.

In January 1968 HMM-163, HMM-262 and VMO-6 were based at Quảng Trị, while HMM-164, HMM-362, HMM-364 and VMO-3 were based at Phu Bai. The group was extensively involved in the Battle of Khe Sanh starting in late January. A detachment from the group's MACTU-62 operated a ground-controlled approach (GCA) radar at Khe Sanh Combat Base to guide aircraft until enemy fire knocked it out on 19 February. HMM-362 kept several UH-34s at Khe Sanh throughout January and February to support Marines in outlying hill positions. Group squadrons supported Marine and Army of the Republic of Vietnam (ARVN) forces during the Battle of Huế. On 15 April the three group squadrons at Quảng Trị were detached to form Provisional Marine Aircraft Group 39. On the same date HMM-363 joined the group. HMH-462 joined he group in August 1968. On 21 September HMM-262 rejoined the group. On 30 September HMM-265 rejoined the group. Commencing on 7 December 1968 and continuing until 8 March 1969 the group supported Operation Taylor Common.

At the beginning of 1969 the group comprised HMH-462 equipped with CH-53As, HMLA-367 (formerly VMO-3) equipped with UH-1Es, HMM-265 equipped with CH-46Ds and HMM-363 equipped with UH-34Ds. On 25 May HMM-362 rejoined the group. On 27 August HMH-361 equipped with CH-53Ds joined the group replacing HMM-363 which had been withdrawn as its UH-34s were withdrawn from service. On 7 November the group withdrew from South Vietnam and was re-based at MCAS Futenma, Okinawa. On 18 November HMH-462, HMM-164, HMM-165, VMO-6 and VMGR-152 were all assigned to the group on Okinawa.

In early 1973, group squadrons participated in Operation End Sweep clearing Haiphong harbor of mines, after which they returned to Futenma.

Throughout 1974 and into early 1975 group units were always assigned as a component of the 31st Marine Amphibious Unit (31st MAU) on board Amphibious Ready Group Alpha ships. The assigned unit actually was a composite squadron, usually either HMM-164 or HMM-165, both flying CH-46Ds augmented by detachments of CH-53Ds from HMH-462; UH-1Es of HML-367 and AH-1J SeaCobras of HMA-369. On 8 January HMH-462 flew via Taiwan to Naval Air Station Cubi Point to join 31st MAU. On 28 January HMH-462 together with three CH-46s, four AH-1Js and a UH-1E from the group embarked onboard USS Okinawa to maintain station off the coast of Cambodia in preparation for the evacuation of Americans. In early April 1975 group units comprising HML-367(Reinforced) with 11 UH-1Es, HMA-369 (Reinforced) with 4 AH-1Js, 14 CH-46Ds of HMM-164 and H&MS-36 were embarked on USS Midway in preparation for the evacuation of Cambodia. On 10 April Midway arrived at U.S. Naval Base Subic Bay and the group's helicopters were transferred to the USS Hancock. The Hancock did not join Task Group 76.4 awaiting the Cambodian evacuation, but instead joined Task Force 76 waiting off the coast of South Vietnam for the evacuation of U.S. civilians and "at-risk" South Vietnamese. On 12 April the composite squadron on the Okinawa participated in Operation Eagle Pull, the evacuation of Phnom Penh. During Operation Frequent Wind, the evacuation of Saigon, the composite squadron flew air support and Sparrowhawk rescue and air cover in addition to participating in the evacuation. At 07:53 on 30 April an HMM-164 CH-46D Swift 2-2 evacuated the last Marine Security Guards from the roof of the U.S. Embassy.

=== Post Vietnam to modern day ===
From the late 1970s through the 1980s, MAG-36 continued to support fleet operations in the Pacific Theater. MAG-36 became the Unit Deployment Program (UDP) linchpin in the Western Pacific (WestPac). As part of the UDP, CH-46, CH-53, and OV-10 squadrons from North Carolina and California deployed to MCAS Futenma for six-month rotations. During these deployments MAG-36 participated in numerous exercises and training deployments to various countries around the WestPac.

In November 1992, the last UDP detachment of OV-10s returned to Camp Pendleton, CA. In the spring of 1993, HMM-262 arrived from Hawaii to become a permanent part of MAG-36. HMM-262 was followed by HMM-265, and these two CH-46 squadrons have formed the backbone of the 31st MEU Aviation Combat Element.

Throughout the 1990s, MAG-36 units participated in a variety of contingency operations. In 1995, MAG-36 units conducted relief operations in Kobe Japan after 6,400 people lost their lives in an earthquake and also participated in the withdrawal of United Nation Forces from Somalia during Operation United Shield. In 1999, units responded to a no-notice deployment to the Persian Gulf for Operation Desert Fox and to East Timor for peacekeeping during Operation STABILIZE.

During the first decade of the 21st century, MAG-36 units continued to support Theater Security Cooperation exercises and numerous contingency operations. In 2004 and 2007 respectively, HMM-265 and HMM-262 deployed for Operation Iraqi Freedom combat operations. Since May 2009, VMGR-152 provided an enduring two-plane detachment to Afghanistan for Operation Enduring Freedom. In 2014, VMGR-152 detached from MAG-36, moving to Iwakuni, Japan and now falls under MAG-12.

Nearly every year, MAG-36 deploys as a MEB-level Aviation Combat Element, often supporting Humanitarian Assistance and Disaster Relief (HADR) operations. In November 2007, in the wake of Tropical Cyclone Sidr MAG-36 elements deployed to Bangladesh for Operation SEA ANGEL II. MAG-36 supported Operation CARING RESPONSE in May 2008 from Thailand after Tropical Cyclone Nargis impacted Burma. Additionally, MAG-36 has conducted HADR in the Philippines on three separate occasions: during 2004 with Joint Task Force 535, following three back-to-back typhoons in October 2009, and again in October 2010 in the wake of Super Typhoon Megi. Most recently during Operation TOMODACHI, MAG-36 deployed to mainland Japan immediately following the triple-disaster created by an earthquake, tsunami, and damaged nuclear reactor to provide much needed relief to our host nation.

== See also ==
- United States Marine Corps Aviation
- List of United States Marine Corps aircraft groups
- List of United States Marine Corps aircraft squadrons
