= Marine Tactical Air Command Squadron 18 =

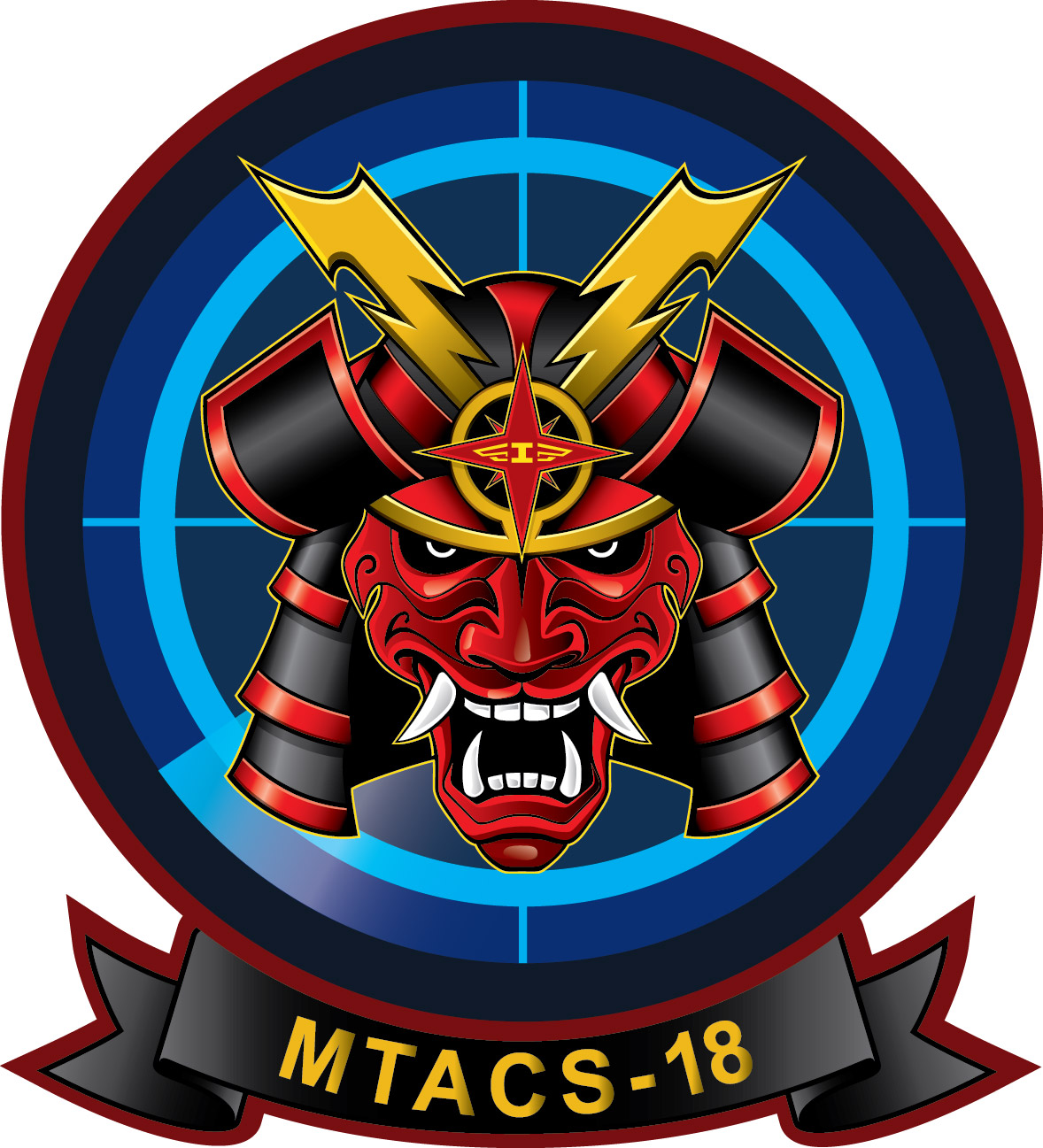
- MTACS-18 Insignia
- Active: 1 Sept 1967 – 9 June 2021
- Country: United States of America
- Branch: United States Marine Corps
- Role: Aviation Combat Element Command Post
- Size: Squadron
- Part of: Marine Air Control Group 18; 1st Marine Aircraft Wing
- Garrison/HQ: Marine Corps Air Station Futenma
- Motto(s): TACC of Excellence

Marine Tactical Air Command Squadron 18 (MTACS-18) was a United States Marine Corps aviation command and control unit based at Marine Corps Air Station Futenma. The squadron provided the 1st Marine Aircraft Wings (1st MAW) tactical headquarters and command post while deployed. MTACS-18 fell under the command of Marine Air Control Group 18 (MACG-18) and 1st MAW. The squadron was decommissioned on 9 June 2021 as part of the service's Force Design 2030. Responsibility for establishing 1st MAW's TACC now resides with the MACG-18 headquarters.

== Mission ==
Provide equipment, maintenance, and operations for the Tactical Air Command Center (TACC) of the Aviation Combat Element (ACE), as a component of the Marine Air-Ground Task Force (MAGTF). Equip, man, operate, and maintain the Current Operations section of the TACC. Provide and maintain a facility for the TACC Future Operations Section; and install and maintain associated automated systems.

== History ==
Headquarters and Headquarters Squadron 18 (H&HS-18) was commissioned on September 1, 1967 at Da Nang Air Base, South Vietnam, as part of Marine Air Control Group 18 and the 1st Marine Aircraft Wing.

From activation until April 1971, H&HS-18 supported89 operations conducted in the 1st Marine Aircraft Wing (1st MAW) Tactical Area of Responsibility within the Republic of Vietnam. During this period the Squadron assisted in the conduct of 215,715 fixed wing sorties, 7,584 KC-130 missions, and 1,225,015 helicopter tasks. As a result of these efforts, Squadron members were awarded a collective total of 9 air medals. The unit was awarded the Presidential Unit Citation Streamer, the National Defense Service Streamer with one bronze star, the Vietnam Service Streamer with two silver stars, the Vietnam Cross of Gallantry with Palm Streamer, and the Vietnam Meritorious Unit Citation Civil Actions Streamer.

Following service in Vietnam, H&HS-18 relocated to Iwakuni, Japan, where the Squadron served as the 1st MAW operational Command Post for over four years. In September 1975, H&HS-18 relocated to Okinawa, Japan, where it remains today. In May 1993, H&HS-18 was re-designated as Marine Tactical Air Command Squadron 18(MTACS-18).

Between April 1971 and March 2007, Squadron members have participated in 242 exercises and operations, including Operation Enduring Freedom, Operation Iraqi Freedom, Operation Unified Assistance in Indonesia, Operation Restore Comfort in the Republic of the Philippines, and Operation Restore Hope in Somalia. The Unit received the Meritorious Unit Commendation Streamer (1982–1984) and three bronze stars in lieu of subsequent streamers (1985–1987, 1997–1999, 2000–2002). In 2001, the Unit received the second bronze star for its National Defense Service streamer. The Unit received the Global War on Terrorism Service Medal 2004.

MTACS-18 routinely supported the Commanding General, 1st MAW, by providing Individual Augments to participate in the Global War on Terrorism and conducting Wing and Group size exercises. Through local training initiatives and exercise participation, MTACS-18 stands ready to support and defend U.S. interests throughout the Western Pacific and beyond.

=== Decommissioning ===
MTACS-18 was formally decommissioned on 9 June 2021 in a ceremony at MCAS Futenma. MTACS-18 is the first of four Marine Tactical Air Control Squadrons that will be decommissioned as part of the Marine Corps Force Design 2030 plan. Going forward, MACG-18 is responsible for maintaining the TACC capability for 1st MAW.

== Gallery ==
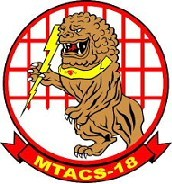

== See also ==
- United States Marine Corps Aviation
- Organization of the United States Marine Corps
- List of United States Marine Corps aviation support units
