= Operation Badger Tooth =

Part of the Vietnam War (1967–1968)

- Part of Vietnam War
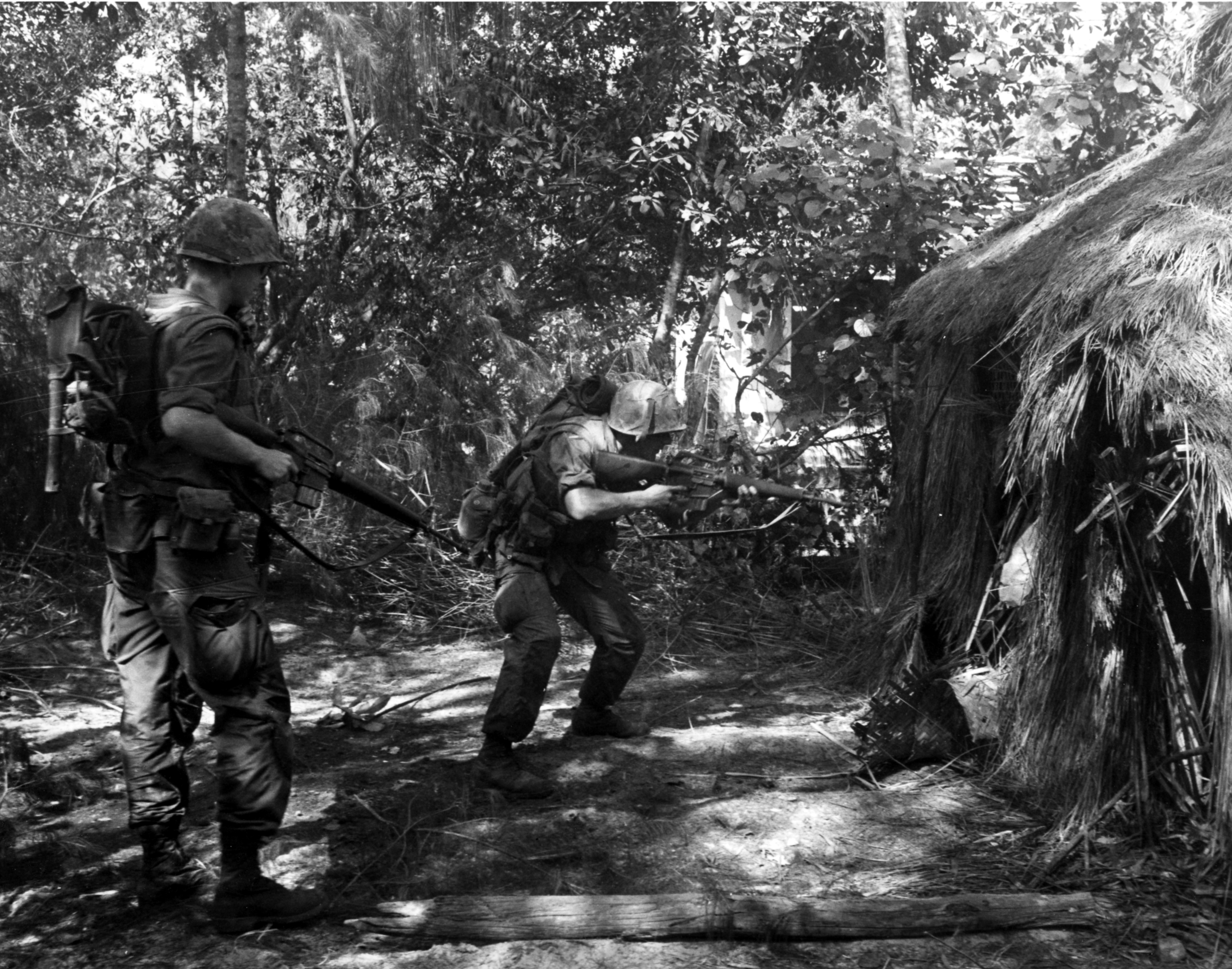
- Marines of K Company, 3rd Battalion, 1st Marines search a hut
Date	26 December 1967 – 2 January 1968
Location	Street Without Joy, Quảng Trị Province, South Vietnam
Result	Inconclusive

Belligerents
United States	North Vietnam

Commanders and leaders
Lieutenant Colonel Max McQuown	Unknown

Units involved
3rd Battalion, 1st Marines	116th Battalion

Casualties and losses
48 killed	US body count: 131+ killed

Operation Badger Tooth was a search and destroy mission in the Street Without Joy area of Quảng Trị Province carried out by the 3rd Battalion, 1st Marines. Launched on 26 December 1967 the operation ended on 2 January 1968. The Marines reported the People's Army of Vietnam (PAVN) lost 131+ killed, while US casualties were 48 killed.

== Background ==
The operational plan called for Special Landing Force (SLF) Bravo Battalion Landing Team (BLT) 3rd Battalion, 1st Marines to land one company by LVT to secure Landing Zone Finch, 3 km inland from the beach on the southern Quảng Trị Province border and the rest of the battalion would then land by helicopter. The objective area was the extreme west of the Street Without Joy and intelligence estimates placed as many as 1700 PAVN/Vietcong (VC) troops in the area. The BLT commander Lieutenant Colonel Max McQuown described the plans for the operation as “The scheme of maneuver called for a river crossing over the Song O Lau river once all the BLT task organisation had landed from ARG shipping. After the river crossing the BLT was to conduct search and destroy operations through 14 towns and villages on a route running southwest from LZ Finch terminating at the town of Ap Phuoc Phu, 11km from LZ Finch. Initial fire support for the operation would be organic 81mm mortars, available on-call air support and naval gunfire support. Once the BLT had closed on the first intermediate objective, Thon Phu Kinh, 105mm howitzers from a platoon of the 3rd Battalion, 12th Marines and a battery from the 1st Battalion, 11th Marines would provide artillery support.”

Information relayed to the SLF by a US Army liaison officer with nearby Army of the Republic of Vietnam (ARVN) units changed the plan. After securing LZ Finch, the SLF directed the BLT to search new objectives consisting of the coastal villages of Thom Thâm Khê (16.7446°N 107.38°E) and Tho Trung An. Intelligence officers suspected PAVN/VC forces were hiding there after evading ARVN operations to the north and west. Once the BLT cleared the two villages, the SLF would continue with the originally planned sweep to the southwest.

== Operation ==
The operation started with Company L, 3/1 Marines landing on Green Beach at 11:00 on 26 December and proceeding to LZ Finch meeting minimal opposition. HMM-262 landed the last elements of the battalion at LZ Finch at 14:15. The SLF commander accompanied by the US Army liaison officer to the ARVN arrived at the battalion command post with orders to change direction and sweep the coastal villages of Thâm Khê and Trung An. Company L was assigned to sweep Thâm Khê with Company M in support. After moving to the edge of the village in LVTs, Company L advanced northwest into the built-up area. By 18:22 Company L had cleared the first village and was well into Trung An. The Marines killed 3 VC and detained 4 suspects, but found no evidence of larger PAVN/VC formations. By 19:40 both Companies established night defensive positions north and west of Thâm Khê.

At 07:00 on 27 December both companies moved out on another sweep of the two villages. Company M moved north on a line parallel to Trung An so it could begin its sweep of the village from north to south. Company L with the mission to sweep Thâm Khê initially moved out to the northeast. Leading elements of Company L were almost into the south of Trung An when Company L’s commander realised that his lead platoon had not turned south towards Thâm Khê. Company L then reversed direction and started towards Thâm Khê. As the lead platoon of Company L approached the edge of the village a concealed PAVN/VC force opened up with a devastating barrage of machine gun, rifle, Rocket-propelled grenade (RPG) and mortar fire inflicting numerous casualties. The Company commander Captain Thomas Hubbell decided to pull his company back and regroup for an attack. He requested supporting arms fire on Thâm Khê while his company prepared for an assault. After two airstrikes followed by naval gunfire Company L assaulted the village but were again met by heavy fire killing Captain Hubbell and his radio operator. Lt Col McQuown lost communications with the company until the acting company executive officer assumed command of the company. While out of radio contact McQuown ordered Company M to move east and south and join the fight on the left flank of Company L. Company M reached its attack position and immediately came under heavy fire. McQuown realised that the 2 companies were up against a major PAVN/VC force in well-prepared defensive positions. McQuown then ordered Company I to move to the south of Thâm Khê, requested that the SLF land the tank platoon and instructed Company K to relieve the pressure on Companies L and M by attacking the south of Thâm Khê.

After hitting the area with 81 mm mortar fire Company K attacked the south of Thâm Khê meeting strong resistance and were unable to make any progress until 2 tanks arrived at their position. The tanks’ communication systems had suffered water damage to their communication systems and could only be instructed by voice. While the tanks did knock out some PAVN/VC positions with their 90 mm gunfire, the inability to coordinated the tanks’ fire with the Company K assault prevented them from making more than a limited penetration into Thâm Khê. All 3 companies continued fight until nightfall. McQuown expect that the PAVN/VC would escape under cover of darkness and so moved Company I to the right flank of Company K where it could control the beach side of Thâm Khê, Company M to the north would cover part of the beach side by fire, while elements of Companies K and L were moved west of Thâm Khê.

On the morning of 28 December Companies K and I renewed their assault on Thâm Khê meeting initial heavy fire but they secured the village by midday. The Marines then conducted a thorough search of the village. McQuown described the search as follows: “This search revealed a village that was literally a defensive bastion. It was prepared for all-around defense in depth with a network of tunnels you could stand up in, running the full length of the village. Connecting tunnels ran east and west. This tunnel system supported ground level bunkers for machine guns, RPGs and small arms around the entire perimeter of the village. Thus the PAVN were able to defend, reinforce or withdraw in any direction. All defensive preparation had been artfully camouflaged with growing vegetation. Residents of Thâm Khê, questioned after the fight, disclosed that the PAVN had been preparing the defense of this village for one year.” The search uncovered numerous machine guns, RPGs, AK-47 rifles and thousands of rounds of ammunition which clearly indicated that a major PAVN force had defended the village, not local VC. A dying PAVN soldier confirmed that the force had been the PAVN 116th Battalion. ARVN forces operating northwest of Thâm Khê found over 100 bodies from the 116th Battalion in sand dunes, the PAVN had apparently evacuated its casualties through the gap between Companies K and L during the night.

== Aftermath ==
At 18:00 on 31 December a New Year’s truce went into effect and SLF Bravo began returning to its ships and by 11:30 on 2 January the BLT had left the operational area. Marine losses during the operation were 48 killed, while PAVN/VC losses were 131+ killed.

On 30 December 1967 Brigadier General Jacob E. Glick ordered an investigation into why the 3/1 Marines had suffered such heavy casualties at Thâm Khê. On 31 December Colonel George Benskin arrived at Thâm Khê and interviewed villagers and senior officers of the battalion. Benskin sent his initial report to Glick on 5 January 1968 and it emphasized the strength of the PAVN's positions with fields of fire permitting them to "neutralize efforts of all attacking units except Company K when supported by tanks." The PAVN had withheld its fire "on all fronts until attacking units were drawn into the killing zones." The terrain together with the village defenses combined in the favor of the PAVN "in every respect." On 15 January Glick sent the report on to Lieutenant General Victor H. Krulak, commander of Fleet Marine Force, Pacific. The battle and the report would lead to a doctrinal debate within the Marines and Military Assistance Command Vietnam about the use of the SLF in Vietnam.

McQuown would later state that "Badger Tooth was an SLF operation in name only because SLF Marines were involved. In reality it was a water-borne/helicopter landing of a bare boots unsupported Marine infantry battalion moving 8 to 10 miles from the water's edge to objectives that lacked even a shred of intelligence to justify the operation."
