= Marine Corps Air Station Futenma =

Airport

- 海兵隊普天間航空基地; Kaiheitai Futenma Kōkū Kichi
- Ginowan, Okinawa Prefecture in Japan
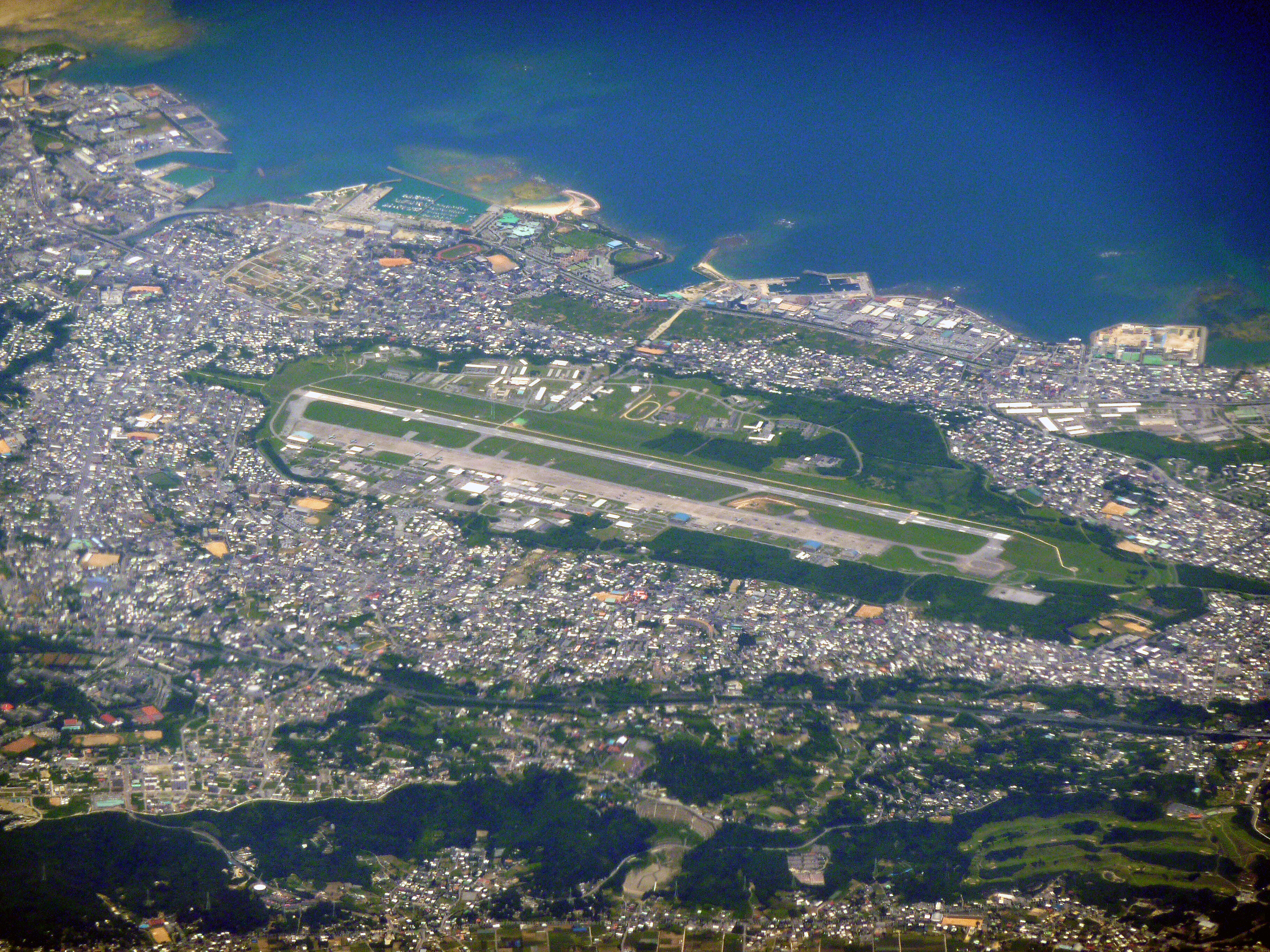
- An aerial view of MCAS Futenma during 2010.

Site information
- Type: Marine Corps Air Station
- Owner: Various (leased by Government of Japan and made available to the US)
- Operator: US Marine Corps
- Controlled by: 1st Marine Aircraft Wing
- Condition: Operational
- Website: www.mcasfutenma.marines.mil

Location
- Location in Japan
- Coordinates: 26°16′15″N 127°44′53″E

Site history
- Built: 1945
- In use: 1945 – present

Garrison information
- Current commander: Colonel William Pacatte
- Garrison: Headquarters and Headquarters Squadron

Airfield information
- Identifiers: ICAO: ROTM, WMO: 479330
- Elevation: 75.5 metres (248 ft) AMSL
Runways
Direction	Length and surface
06/24	2,740 metres (8,990 ft) Asphalt/Concrete
- Source: Japanese AIP at AIS Japan

Marine Corps Air Station Futenma or MCAS Futenma (Japanese: 海兵隊普天間航空基地, Hepburn: Kaiheitai Futenma Kōkū Kichi)^{A} (ICAO: ROTM) is a United States Marine Corps base located in Ginowan, Okinawa, Japan, 5 NM (9.3 km; 5.8 mi) northeast^{B} of Naha, on the island of Okinawa. It is home to approximately 3,000 Marines of the 1st Marine Aircraft Wing and other units, and has been a U.S. military airbase since the defeat of the Japanese Imperial Army in the Battle of Okinawa in 1945. Marine Corps pilots and aircrew are assigned to the base for training and providing air support to other land and sea-based Marines in Okinawa and throughout the Asia-Pacific region. MCAS Futenma is part of the Marine Corps Installations Pacific command.

MCAS Futenma is situated in Ginowan City (pop. 93,661). The base includes a 2,740 by 45 m (8,990 by 148 ft)^{A} runway at 75 meters elevation, as well as extensive barracks, administrative and logistical facilities. The air station is tasked with operating a variety of fixed wing, rotary wing and tilt rotor aircraft in support of the III Marine Expeditionary Force, the Japan U.S. defense alliance and many allies and treaty partners in the region. The base is also used as a United Nations air distribution hub facility for response to disaster or other crisis requiring air supplies, due to the length of the runway and elevation.

== History ==
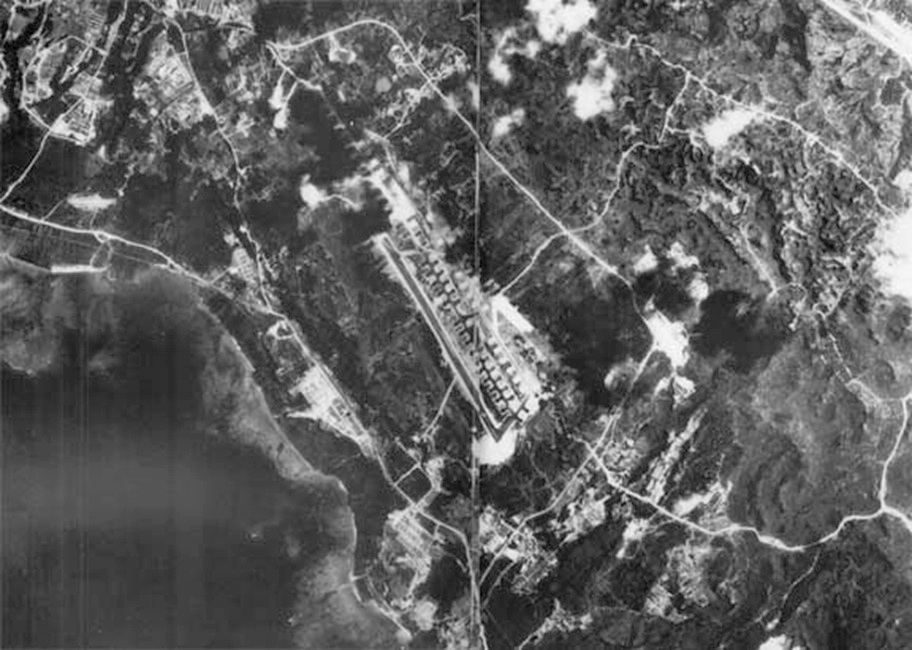
Futenma Air Base in Okinawa, Japan circa 1945

Futenma Airfield was constructed by the US military following the Battle of Okinawa in 1945. According to Ginowan City records, the joint population of what was then Ginowan Village (now Ginowan City) was 12,994 in 1944. It was initially allocated for Eighth Air Force use to station B-29 Superfortress strategic bombers in the planned Invasion of Japan. With the end of the war, the airfield became a United States Air Force Far East Air Force installation known as Futenma Air Base, and was used as a support airfield for the nearby Kadena Air Base, hosting fighter-interceptor squadrons as part of the air defense of the Ryukyu Islands. The base was transferred to the United States Navy on 30 June 1957 and was subsequently developed into a United States Marine Corps air station by Seabees from USN Mobile Construction Battalion 3 augmented by a detachment from MCB 2. When the Seabees were done they had also made facilities on the base for Navy Communications Unit 37 Futenma to transfer from Kadena. In 1957 the name changed to Naval Security Group Activity Futenma and changed again in 1960 to Naval Security Group Hanza. The group decommissioned on Futenma in 1999.

Marine Corps Air Facility Futenma was formally dedicated on May 7, 1960, with Marine Aircraft Group 16 (MAG-16) as the first operational tenant.

Each year, MCAS Futenma opens its gates for the Futenma Flight Line Fair, which includes U.S. band performances, entertainment, static displays of all aircraft, military vehicles and demonstrations.

== Capability ==
Futenma's 75 m elevation provides a safe and effective location to provide humanitarian assistance and disaster relief operations in the event of a tsunami, which would render the sea-level Naha international airport inoperable. The 9,000 ft (2,743.2 m) runway also gives the capability of safely landing the largest commercial and military cargo planes in the world, including the Antonov An-124 Ruslan, which has landed at Futenma multiple times. Futenma has a high record of safety with well established procedures.

== Based units ==
Flying and notable non-flying units based at MCAS Futenma.

=== United States Marine Corps ===
Marine Corps Installations – Pacific

- Headquarters and Headquarters Squadron – UC-12W Huron and UC-35D Encore

Marine Air Control Group 18

- Marine Air Control Squadron 4 (MACS-4)
- Marine Air Support Squadron 2 (MASS-2)
- Marine Tactical Air Command Squadron 18 (MTACS-18)
- Personnel Support Detachment 18 (PSD-18)

Marine Aircraft Group 36

- Marine Aviation Logistics Squadron 36 (MALS-36)
- Marine Medium Tilt-rotor Squadron 262 (VMM-262) – MV-22B Osprey
- Marine Medium Tilt-rotor Squadron 265 (VMM-265) – MV-22B Osprey
- Marine Wing Support Squadron 172 (MWSS - 172)

== Community ==
The airbase has become a focal point of various political controversies in recent years. Due to population growth and encroachment around the base, concerns surrounding flights over residential areas causing noise, air pollution and endangering public safety also became controversial issues in Ginowan City, as the airport is surrounded all around by residential areas, very similar to Hong Kong's old airport before relocation in 1998. Safety concerns were raised after the August 2004 crash of a Marine Corps CH-53D transport helicopter on the campus of Okinawa International University after the aircraft suffered mechanical issues. Three crew members had minor injuries, but there were no injuries on the ground. The Guardian has stated that the location of MCAS Futenma in Ginowan "would be like having F22s landing in Hyde Park [in London]."

Local residents also became concerned over pollution and ground water and soil contamination caused by the base's activities: for example, Lt. Col. (Ret.) Kris Roberts (USMC) told The Japan Times that his base maintenance team unearthed leaking barrels of Agent Orange at the base in 1981. The U.S. Department of Defense (DoD) states that Agent Orange was never present on Okinawa, and an investigation commissioned by the DoD found no evidence that Agent Orange was ever on Okinawa (See Agent Orange: Okinawa, Japan for more details.) In 2019, high levels of perfluorooctane sulfonate (PFOS) were found in the waters near the installation as well as in Ginowan residents' blood but the USMC did not grant permission to Okinawa Prefectural authorities to inspect the base.

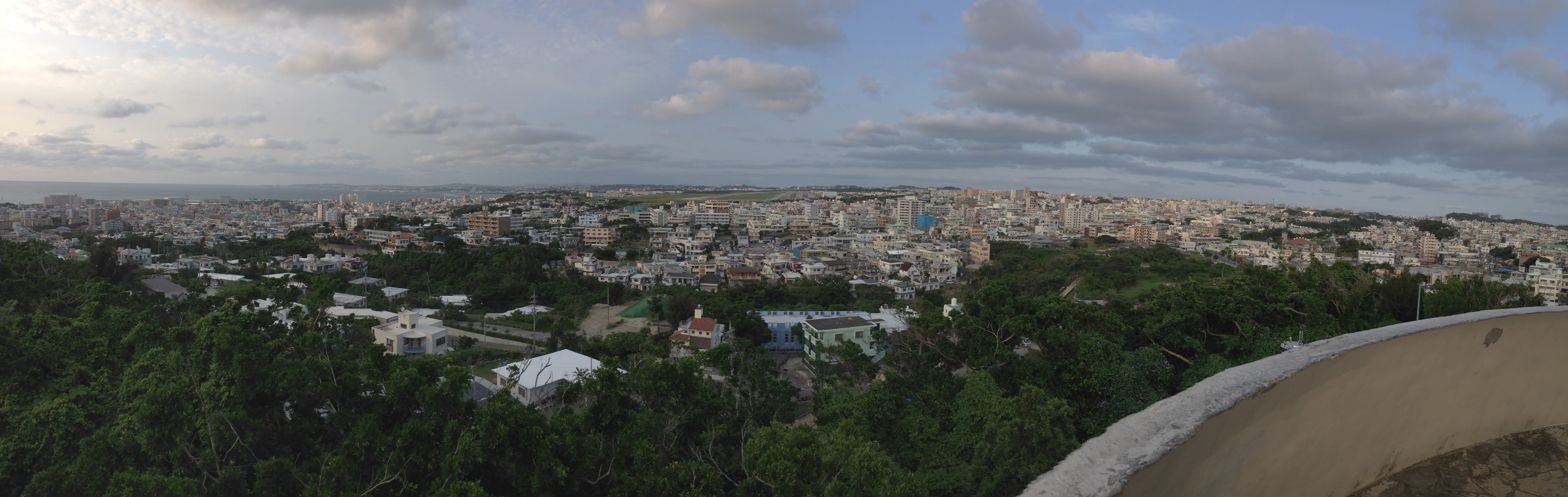
Marine Corps Air Station Futenma and the town of Ginowan, Okinawa.

Special interest groups, including supporters and protestors, often gather outside the gates of Futenma. Local Okinawan citizens clean vandalism and debris left by protest groups weekly.

Mayor Atsushi Sakima of Ginowan City and Col. James G. Flynn, commanding officer of Marine Corps Air Station Futenma, signed a bilateral agreement 26 June 2013 at MCAS Futenma specifying procedures for the evacuation of Okinawa residents in the event a natural disaster and provisions for evacuation drills to maintain readiness. Immediately before, during or following a natural disaster, especially a tsunami, MCAS Futenma can use the procedures to open one or more of the station's gates to allow evacuees immediate and direct passage to higher ground or shelter. This agreement comes after thorough collaboration between Ginowan City and MCAS Futenma and signifies the importance that the city and air station place on mutual safety and cooperation, said officials.

The base, along with its impact on families living nearby and local cultural heritage, are the subject of the short story collection To Futenma by Okinawan author Tatsuhiro Oshiro.

== Relocation ==
There have been various plans to relocate Marine Corps Air Station Futenma base—first off the island and then within the island—however, as of November 2014 the future of any relocation is uncertain with the election of base-opponent Onaga as Okinawa governor. Onaga won against the incumbent Nakaima who had earlier approved landfill work to move the base to Camp Schwab in Henoko. However, Onaga has promised to veto the landfill work needed for the new base to be built and insisted Futenma should be moved outside of Okinawa. In August 2015, the Japanese government agreed to halt construction activities temporarily while talks with Okinawan officials continued. US sources insist nothing about their approach has changed.

== See also ==
- Marine Corps Base Camp Smedley D. Butler
- List of United States Marine Corps installations
- List of airports in Japan
- United States Forces Japan

== Footnotes ==
A.In the Japanese language MCAS Futenma is formally known as: Kaiheitai Futenma Kōkū Kichi (海兵隊普天間航空基地), more commonly as: Futenma Hikōjō (普天間飛行場), and is commonly abbreviated in speech and writing as: Futenma Kichi (普天間基地).
B.The text version gives a runway 2,740 by 45 m (8,990 by 148 ft) and the aerodrome chart gives 9,000 by 150 ft (2,743 by 46 m).

== Bibliography ==
- Bulldozers and Bayonets, Office of Historiography, Department of Archives Administration, Okinawa Prefectural Culture Promotion Foundation (ed.), (1998), Naha
- "Report by the American Congress research service about Futenma, January 2016" (PDF).
