= VMM-262 =

Marine Medium Tiltrotor Squadron 262
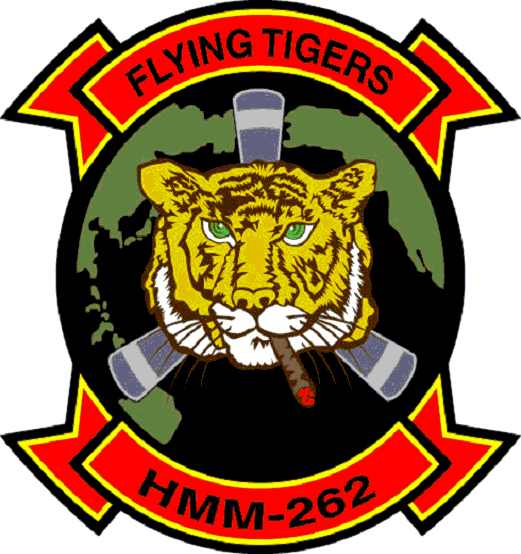
- VMM-262 (REIN) Insignia
- Active: September, 1951 - September, 2013
- Country: United States
- Allegiance: United States of America
- Branch: United States Marine Corps
- Type: Medium Lift Tiltrotor Squadron
- Role: Conduct air operations in support of the Fleet Marine Forces
- Part of: Marine Aircraft Group 36; 1st Marine Aircraft Wing
- Garrison/HQ: Marine Corps Air Station Futenma
- Nickname: "Flying Tigers"
- Tail Code: ET
- Engagements: Operation Powerpack; Vietnam War * Battle of Khe Sahn; Operation Iraqi Freedom

Commanders
- Commanding Officer: LtCol. Derick E. Staffenson

Marine Medium Tiltrotor Squadron 262 (VMM-262) is a United States Marine Corps tiltrotor squadron consisting of MV-22B Osprey tiltrotor aircraft. The squadron, known as the "Flying Tigers", is based at Marine Corps Air Station Futenma, Okinawa, Japan and falls under the command of Marine Aircraft Group 36 (MAG-36) and the 1st Marine Aircraft Wing (1st MAW).

== Mission ==
Provide assault support transport of combat troops, supplies, and equipment during expeditionary, joint, or combined operations. Be prepared for short-notice, worldwide employment in support of Marine Air-Ground Task Force operations.

== History ==
=== Early years ===
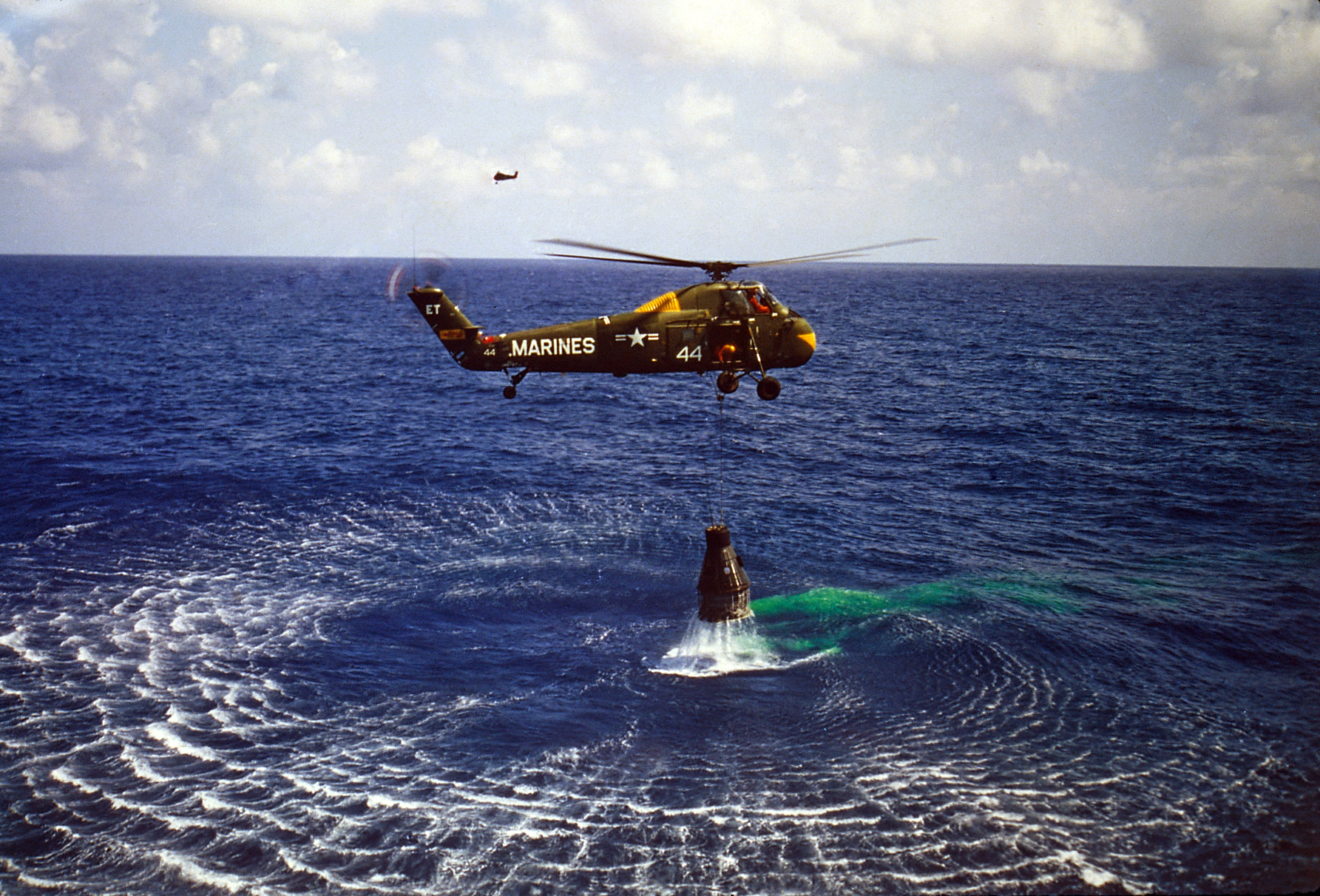
Marine Corps HUS-1 helicopter from HMR-262 retrieves Freedom 7 from the Atlantic

Marine Medium Helicopter Squadron 262 was activated in September 1951 at Marine Corps Air Station Cherry Point, North Carolina and designated Marine Helicopter Transport Squadron 262 (HMR-262). Although activated during the Korean War, the squadron remained on the U.S. east coast providing helicopter support for the Fleet Marine Force units of that area. In February 1952, the Squadron was assigned to Marine Aircraft Group 26. During July 1954, the Squadron was relocated to Marine Corps Air Station New River, North Carolina where it remained until 1966.

On 1 February 1962, the Squadron's designation was changed to Marine Medium Helicopter Squadron 262 and, in April through June 1965, HMM-262 participated in Operation Powerpack in the Dominican Republic.

=== Vietnam War ===
The squadron, equipped with 24 CH-46A Sea Knights was deployed to South Vietnam on 4 December 1966 and assigned to Marine Aircraft Group 36 (MAG-36), 1st Marine Aircraft Wing at Kỳ Hà.

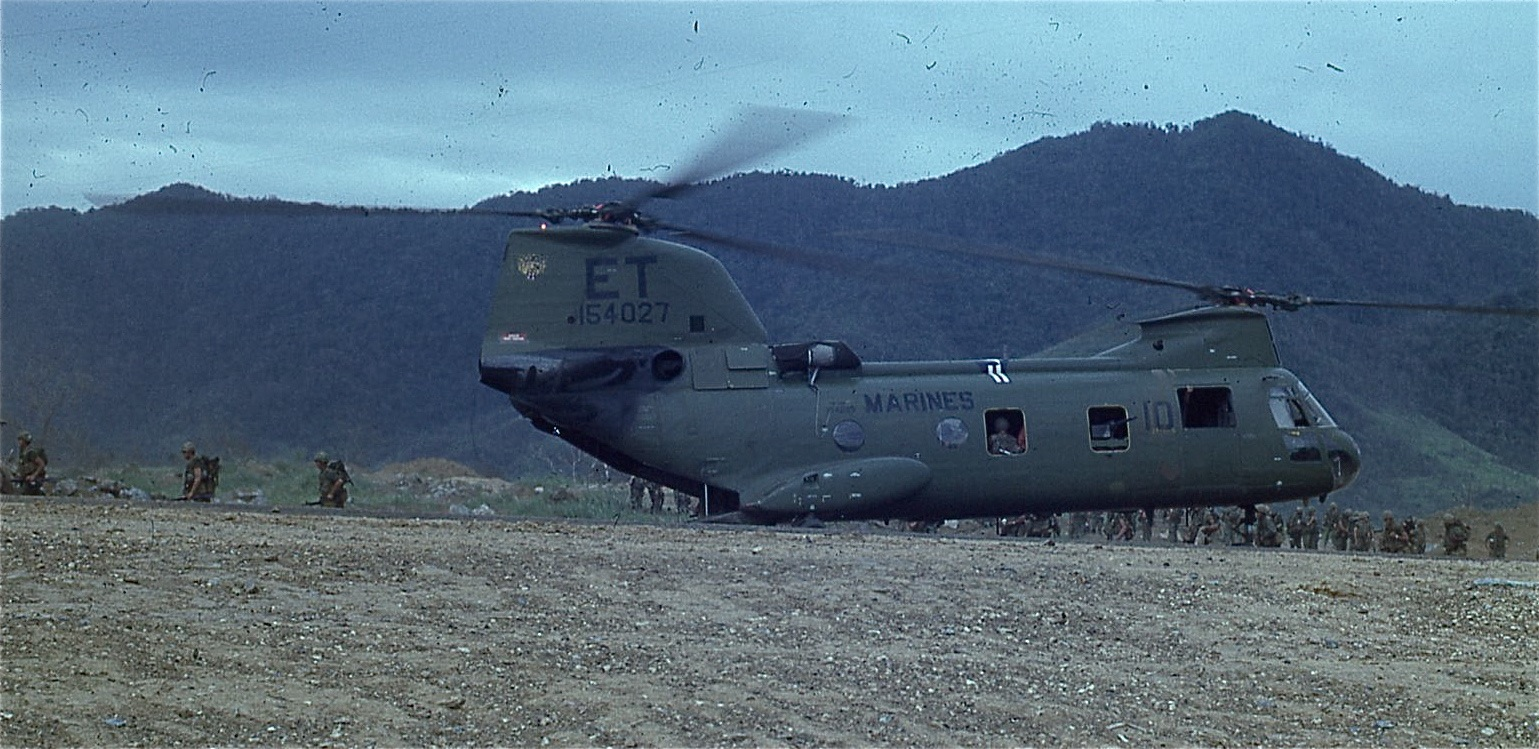
HMM-262 CH-46A at Landing Zone Stud.

In late January 1967 the squadron supported Operation Desoto. On 23 August the squadron flew onboard USS Tripoli to serve as the Special Landing Force (SLF) Bravo helicopter squadron. In September with the grounding of all CH-46s due to structural failure the squadron was detached from the SLF to assist in the modification of CH-46s on Okinawa while a detachment remained on USS Valley Forge. In late December the squadron participated in SLF Bravo's Operation Badger Tooth.

On 10 January 1968 the squadron returned ashore, rejoining MAG-36 at Quảng Trị Combat Base. The squadron was extensively involved in supporting marine forces in the Battle of Khe Sanh. On 15 April the squadron, together with other MAG-36 units at Quảng Trị were transferred to Provisional Marine Aircraft Group 39. On 21 September 1969, the squadron was transferred back to MAG-36.

On 16 October 1969 the squadron, now based at Phu Bai Combat Base was transferred to Marine Aircraft Group 16.

On 7 May 1971 the squadron was stood down at Marble Mountain Air Facility.

=== Post Vietnam ===
With the withdrawal of troops from Vietnam, HMM-262 relocated to MCAS Kaneohe Bay, Hawaii during 1971 and was assigned to Marine Aircraft Group 24.

While stationed at Kaneohe Bay, Hawaii, HMM-262 provided helicopter support to the 1st Marine Amphibious Brigade, FMF. In December 1976, HMM-262 was designated as the first Hawaii-based helicopter squadron to deploy to the western Pacific as a composite squadron. The squadron deployed aboard USS Tripoli on 17 November and remained the "Cutting Edge" of the 31st MAU for the next eight months.

The Flying Tigers boarded USS Belleau Wood in March 1990 to become the first Hawaii-based helicopter squadron to deploy aboard ship since 1985. In August 1990, HMM-262 deployed to Okinawa, Japan on UDP (Unit Deployment Plan) and re-positioned its flag in September 1990 to NAS Cubi Point, Republic of the Philippines, to become the ACE (air combat element) in support of Marine Air-Ground Task Force 4-90 (MAGTF 4-90). The squadron participated in emergency flood/earthquake relief efforts and was extended overseas due to Operation Desert Shield/Storm and returned to Hawaii on 4 June 1991.

In September 1992, the Flying Tigers once again embarked aboard USS Belleau Wood and participated in Hurricane Iniki relief efforts on the island of Kauai. On 27 September 1992, the Squadron transferred its home base to MCAS Futenma, MAG-36, 1st MAW, Okinawa. This effectively transitioned the Flying Tigers to become the first permanently assigned HMM squadron in the region since 1978.

=== Since 2000 ===
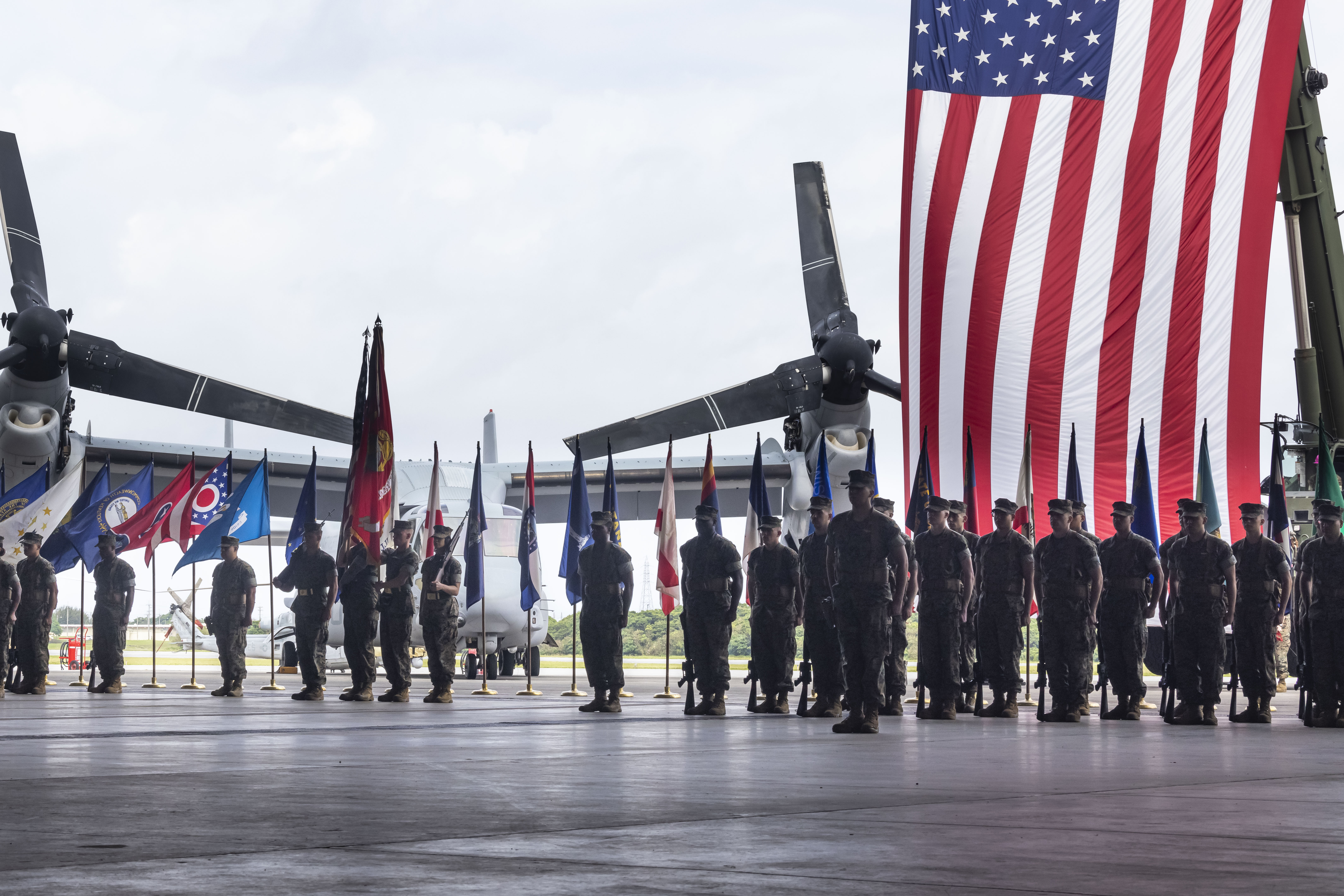
U.S. Marines with Marine Medium Tiltrotor Squadron (VMM) 262 stand in formation during a change of command ceremony on MCAS Futenma, Okinawa, Japan, May 1, 2025

In October 2001, HMM-262 (REIN) sent a detachment of personnel and aircraft aboard USS Harpers Ferry to the new nation of East Timor for humanitarian assistance operations. As all Unit Deployment Program personnel were frozen in December 2001, the squadron concluded the year with a "Be Prepared To" order to remain the ACE for the 31st Marine Expeditionary Unit (MEU) and to prepare for potential contingency operations. After 18 months as the ACE of the 31st MEU, the Squadron was again reassigned to MAG-36 and was named a Chief of Naval Operations Aviation Safety Award winner for calendar year 2002.

In December 2004, HMM-262 deployed to the Philippines as part of Joint Task Force-535 in support of its Humanitarian Aid/Disaster Relief (HA/DR) mission. In only nine days of flying, the Squadron delivered over 204,800 pounds (92,900 kg) of food, water, and supplies to an isolated area that had been devastated by flooding and mudslides resulting from a succession of typhoons.

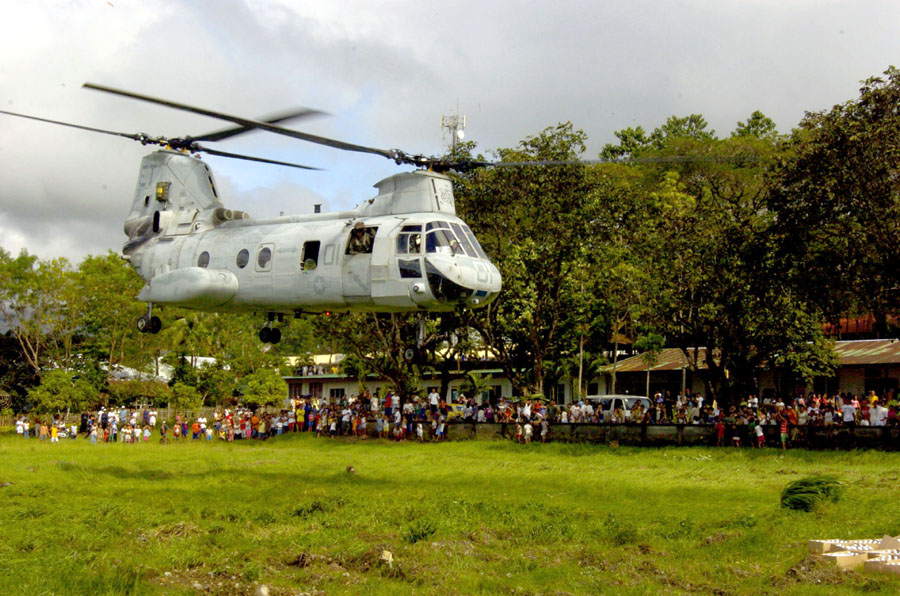
A CH-46 from HMM-262 takes off from a field in Leyte as part of the humanitarian operations following the 2006 mudslides

From January through March 2005, HMM-262 deployed aboard USS Fort McHenry and USS Essex as part of Joint Task Force-536 in support of Operation Unified Assistance, the HA/DR effort following the 2004 Indian Ocean earthquake/tsunami. Operating off the northwestern coast of Sumatra, Indonesia, HMM-262 supported the effort by delivering aid and supplies to the victims of the massive tsunamis. During the period from 14 January to 9 February, the Squadron delivered over 493,755 pounds (223,964 kg) of food, water, and other supplies to an area that spanned over 120 miles (190 km) of coastline. At the conclusion of this effort the squadron was selected to provide helicopter lift on 19 & 20 February 2005 for former Presidents Bill Clinton and George H. W. Bush during their tour of the tsunami-devastated areas of Thailand and Indonesia.

In February 2006, the squadron was again on board USS Essex as part of the 31st MEU when called to provide humanitarian assistance to those affected by the 2006 Southern Leyte mudslide.

In January 2007, HMM-262 deployed to Iraq in support of Operation Iraqi Freedom. This marked the first combat deployment of the squadron since the Vietnam War. The squadron was based at Al Taqaddum Air Base and their mission was to provide assault support for II Marine Expeditionary Force (II MEF) units in Al Anbar Province. From February to May 2007 the squadron flew 1,574 sorties totaling 2,532 flight hours. They also had one Marine killed in action

On 30 September 2013, the CH-46E Sea Knights from HMM-262 made their final flight from Marine Corps Air Station Futenma, and were retired to make way for the MV-22B Ospreys. HMM-262's CH-46Es were the last of their type in Okinawa, and the Pacific. The unit was re-designated as Marine Medium Tiltrotor Squadron 262 (VMM-262).

In November 2013, Typhoon Haiyan, the strongest recorded typhoon in history, struck the Philippines. VMM-262 deployed a detachment of four Ospreys in support of Operation Damayan, carrying supplies and personnel throughout the damaged areas. The vast size of the affected area plus the lack of runways for traditional fixed wing aircraft made the Osprey the perfect platform for disaster relief.

When a 7.8 magnitude earthquake rocked the inland country Nepal in May 2015, VMM-262 self-deployed a detachment of MV-22B Ospreys from Okinawa to Kathmandu in order to support aid operations during Operation SAHAYOGI HAAT. Along with Joint Task Force 505, the Tigers delivered shelter material and food to disaster-stricken areas throughout the Himalayan mountains.

While attached to the 31st Marine Expeditionary Unit in the fall of 2018, VMM-262 Reinforced responded to Guam and the Northern Mariana Islands following Super Typhoon Yutu. V-22s and CH-53s from the Flying Tigers carried FEMA personnel, supplies, and Marines ashore to help provide relief to the stricken islands.

In February 2020, VMM-262 was tasked with supporting the Singapore Air Show. The 10 hour transit, piloted by Major Scott Wood, Capts John Brown, James Nardi, and Christopher Syrowik and supported by a KC-130 of VMGR-152, was the longest duration flight flown in the MV-22.

== The ManaTiger ==
A mythical beast, the pilots of HMM-262 and now VMM-262 rub the ManaTiger for good luck before each flight.

VMM-262's mascot is the "ManaTiger", a combination of a tiger and a manatee. It is a play on the unit's motto of "Every Man a Tiger".

== See also ==
- United States Marine Corps Aviation
- Organization of the United States Marine Corps
- List of active United States Marine Corps aircraft squadrons
