= Chu Lai =

Place in Quảng Nam Province, Vietnam

Coordinates: 15.412275°N 108.704478°E

Chu Lai is a seaport, urban and industrial area in Núi Thành District, Quảng Nam Province, Vietnam. The city is served by Chu Lai International Airport. It is also the site of the Chu Lai Open Economic Zone (Vietnamese: Khu Kinh Tế Mở Chu Lai).

== History ==
=== Vietnam War ===
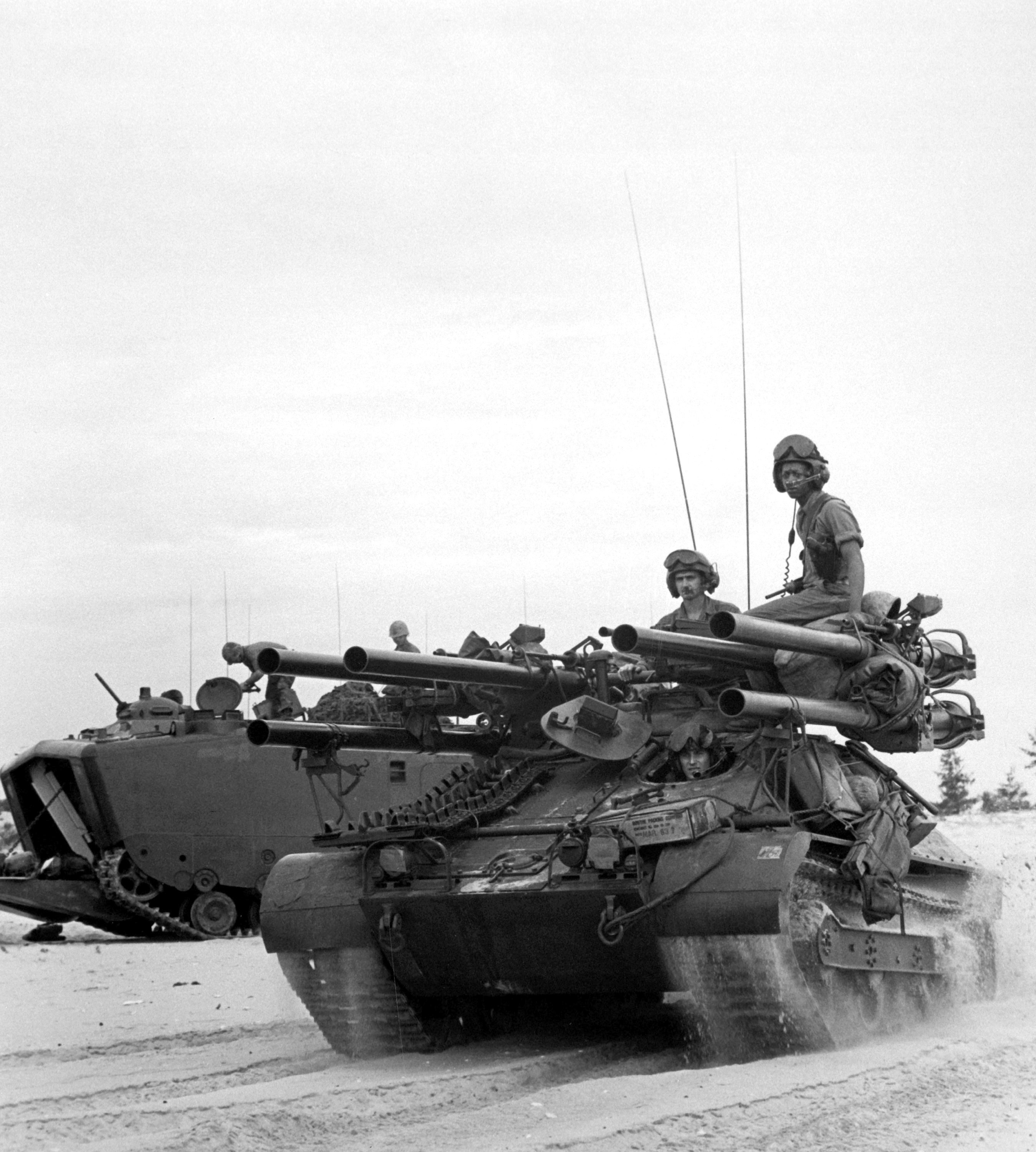
Ontos on Chu Lai beach search for a defensive position shortly after descending from the landing crafts aboard the USS Thomaston. June 1965. Navy.

Chu Lai was a United States Marine Corps military base from 1965 to 1970, and a United States Army military base from 1970 to 1971 during the Vietnam War. Roughly 56 miles (90 km) southeast of Đà Nẵng, the base had an airfield to supplement the major base at Đà Nẵng. It was not named for any local geographic feature, but rather was named by then Major General Victor Krulak using the Mandarin Chinese characters for his own name. Lieutenant General Victor H. "Brute" Krulak, then the commanding general of Fleet Marine Force, Pacific.

Da Nang Air Base was the first major airfield used by the United States Marine Corps during the Vietnam War. Shortly after conventional ground forces began arriving in country in 1965, it became necessary to open a second airfield because of the heavy traffic into and out of Đà Nẵng.

On 6 May 1965 units from the ARVN 2nd Division and 3rd Battalion, 9th Marines secured the Chu Lai area. On 7 May, the 3rd Marine Expeditionary Brigade (3rd MEB), composed of the 4th Marine Regiment, 3rd Reconnaissance Battalion, elements of Marine Aircraft Group 12 (MAG-12) and Naval Mobile Construction Battalion 10 landed at Chu Lai to establish a jet-capable airfield and base area.

Chu Lai Air Base became operational on 1 June 1965 and remained in use by Marine aviation units until September 1970.

The Seabees of MCB-10 built the helicopter pad, and the Marines also established a combat base and helicopter facility on the Kỳ Hà peninsula north of the air base. The Marine base was handed over to the U.S. Army's Task Force Oregon in April 1967 and subsequently became the headquarters and base area for the U.S. 23rd (Americal) Infantry Division from September 1967 until November 1971.

== Auto factory ==
Since 2001, Kia Motors has manufactured automobiles at its Chu Lai Plant as part of a joint ventured with Truong Hai Automobile Co. The site covers 320 hectares (790 acres), and Truong Hai was the first private company in Vietnam to manufacture automobiles, and the first to achieve an annual output of 5,000 automobiles. The facility expanded in 2003 on 38 hectares (94 acres) in Tam Hiep Industrial Park with an investment of VND1,900 billion. In 2007, Truong Hai Automobile Co. Ltd became Truong Hai Automobile Joint Stock Company (Thaco), with automobiles marketed as Thaco-Kia.
