= 6th Vietnamese Parachute Battalion =

The 6th Vietnamese Parachute Battalion (Fr: 6e bataillon de parachutistes vietnamiens) was a French-Vietnamese paratroop battalion formed in French Indochina in 1954.

== Operational history ==
The 6th Vietnamese Parachute Battalion (6 BPVN) was one of five battalions of Vietnamese paratroopers raised by the French Army between 1951 and 1957 as part of General Jean de Lattre de Tassigny's policy to establish a Vietnamese Army.

== Commanding officers ==
The commander of the French unit, the 6th Colonial Parachute Battalion (6ème Régiment de Parachutistes Coloniaux), was Colonel Marcel Bigeard, who led the battalion during the First Indochina War, including at the Battle of Dien Bien Phu. After Bigeard, Lieutenant Colonel Louis Fourcade was commander of the 1st Airborne Task Force, which included the 6th Battalion, during the Dien Bien Phu campaign.

== See also ==
- 1st Vietnamese Parachute Battalion
- 3rd Vietnamese Parachute Battalion
- 5th Vietnamese Parachute Battalion
- 7th Vietnamese Parachute Battalion
- 1st Cambodian Parachute Regiment
- 1st Laotian Parachute Battalion
