= Republic of Vietnam Airborne Division =

- Vietnamese: Binh chủng Nhảy dù Quân lực Việt Nam Cộng hòa
- Vietnamese Airborne Division insignia
- Active: 1 January 1948 – 30 April 1975
- Country: State of Vietnam; Republic of Vietnam
- Allegiance: State of Vietnam; Republic of Vietnam
- Branch: Vietnamese National Army; Army of the Republic of Vietnam
- Type: Airborne forces
- Size: 13,000 in 1967
- Garrison/HQ: Tan Son Nhut, near Saigon
- Nicknames: Bawouans (in French); Lính nhảy dù (in Vietnamese); Thiên thần mũ đỏ (Angels in Red Hats); Thiên binh (Heavenly Army)
- Mottos: Thiên Thần Sát Cộng (Angels kill communists )
- Colors: Red
- Anniversaries: September 29 (Saint Michael’s Day)
- Engagements: First Indochina War; Vietnam War; Cambodian Civil War; Laotian Civil War

Commanders
- Notable commanders: Đỗ Cao Trí; Nguyễn Văn Vỹ; Cao Văn Viên; Ngô Quang Trưởng; Nguyễn Khánh; Dư Quốc Đống; Nguyễn Chánh Thi; Nguyễn Khoa Nam; Đoàn Văn Quảng; Lê Quang Lưỡng

Insignia
- Division flag

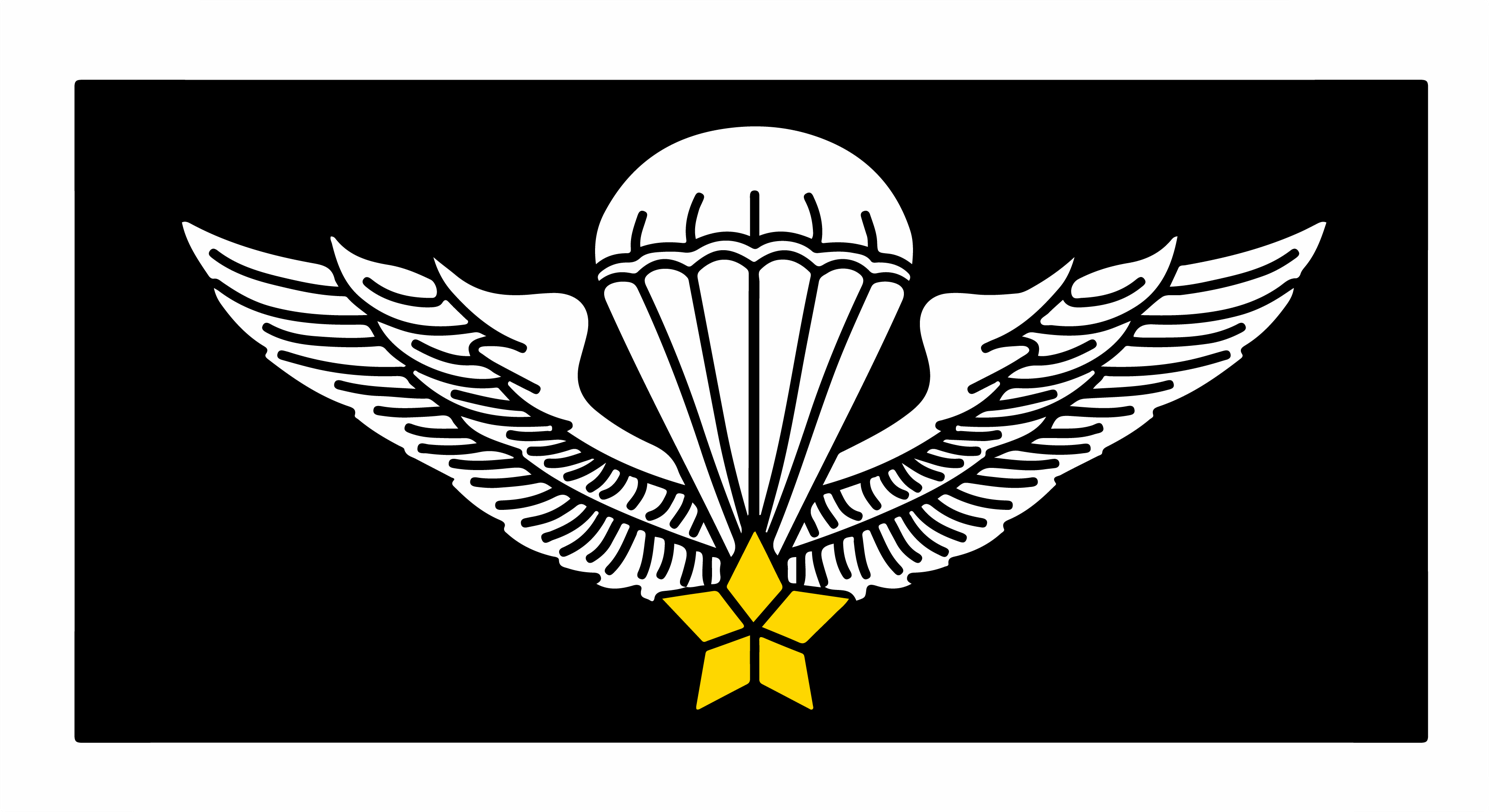
- Parachute Qualification Badge

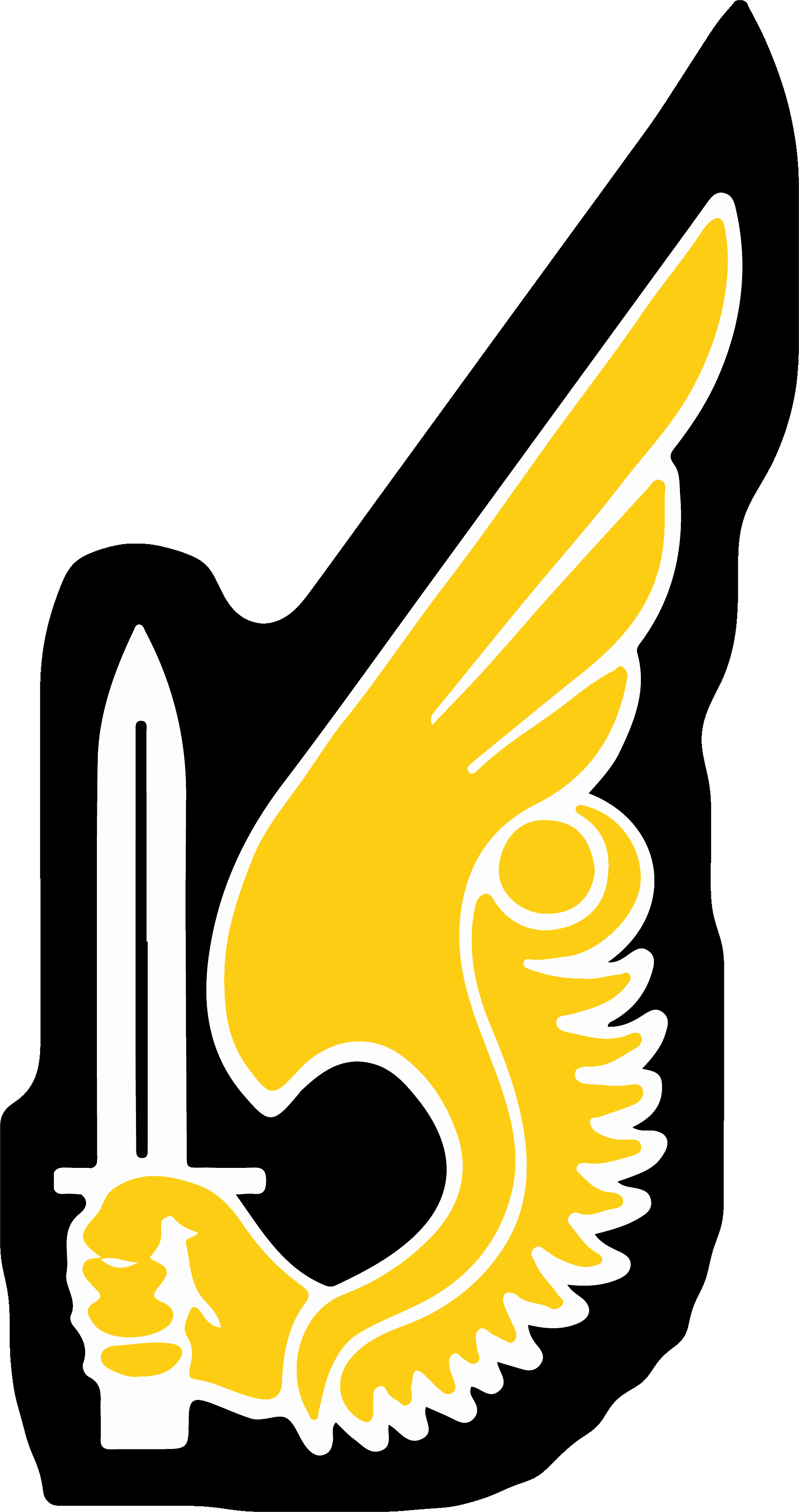
- Jump Status Designator

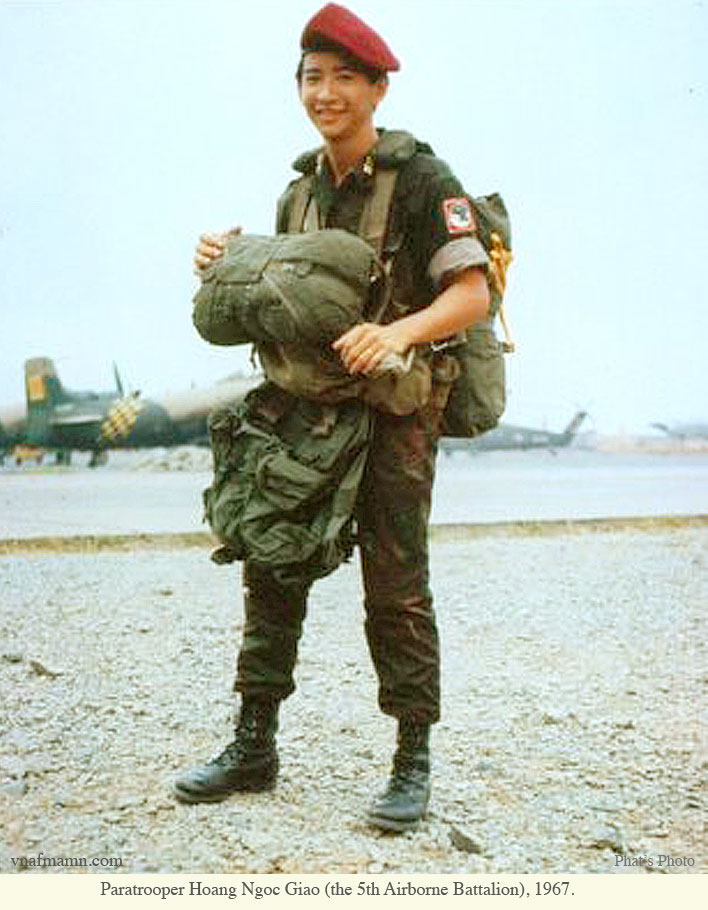
Paratrooper Hoàng Ngọc Giao (the 5th Airborne Battalion), 1967.

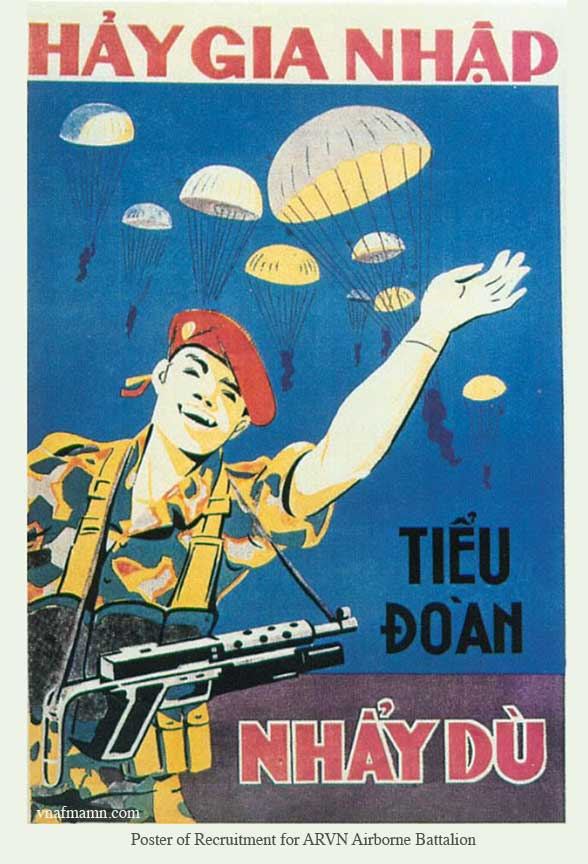
Recruitment poster of the Republic of Vietnam Airborne Forces

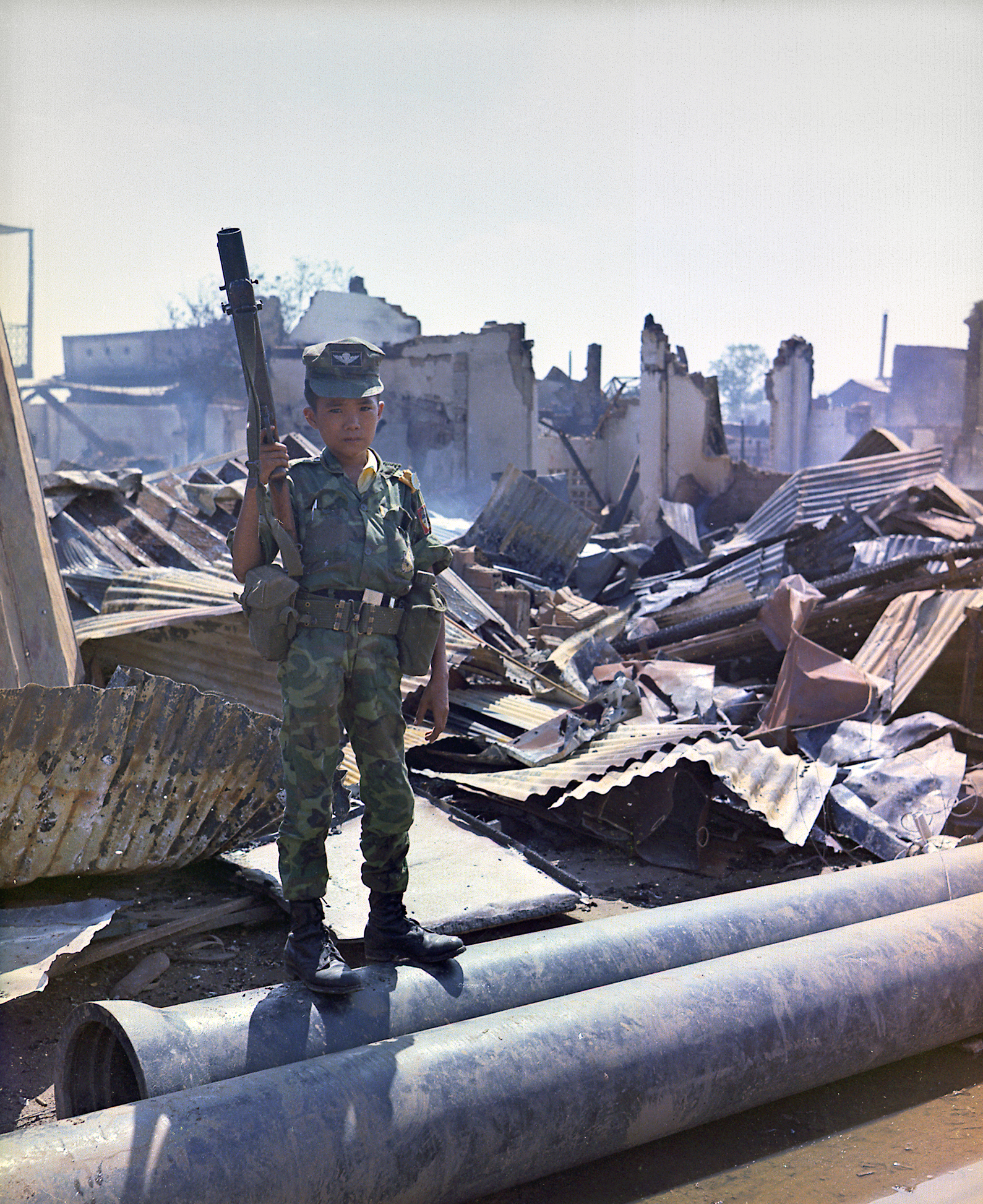
A 12-year-old child mascot of the Airborne Division holds an M79 grenade launcher

The Vietnamese Airborne Division or VNAD (Vietnamese: Sư đoàn Nhảy dù Quân lực Việt Nam Cộng hòa) or Vietnamese: Binh chủng Nhảy dù Việt Nam Cộng hòa) was one of the earliest components of the Republic of Vietnam Military Forces (Vietnamese: Quân lực Việt Nam Cộng hòa – QLVNCH). The Vietnamese Airborne Division began as companies organized in 1948, prior to any agreement over armed forces in Vietnam. After the partition of Vietnam, it became a part of the Army of the Republic of Vietnam (ARVN). This division had its distinct origins in French-trained paratrooper battalions, with predecessor battalions participating in major battles including Dien Bien Phu and retained distinct uniforms and regalia. With the formation of an independent republic, the colonial paratroopers were dissolved, however regalia and aesthetics alongside the nickname "Bawouans" would be retained.

The Airborne Division, alongside the Vietnamese Rangers and the Marine Division were often regarded as among the most effective units, with former airborne advisor General Barry McCaffrey noting that "those of us privileged to serve with them were awestruck by their courage and tactical aggressiveness. The senior officers and non-commissioned officers were extremely competent and battle-hardened." Eight of nine battalions and three headquarters had earned US Presidential Unit Citation of which eight of these were earned by the Airborne between 1967 and 1968 which included the Tet Offensive period. Airborne commanders were often highly rated, with Airborne Commander Ngô Quang Trưởng once described by former Airborne-adviser and Gulf War commanding General Norman Schwarzkopf Jr. as "the most brilliant tactical commander I have ever known".

== History ==
The Airborne Division had its origins in Indochinese-specific units raised under the "jaunissement" program, separating Indochinese members of French paratrooper units of the French Far East Expeditionary Corps forming separate battalions under the Vietnamese National Army, after the independent State of Vietnam was established with the Élysée Accords taking effect on 14 June 1949. Among these are the 1e BPVN, 3e BPVN and 5e BPVN who were airdropped into combat during the Battle of Dien Bien Phu. Most were killed afterward upon capture by the Viet Minh, then bargained as the French had been. Because they were regarded as "traitors" for fighting alongside the colonial soldiers, rather than join them in their fight for independence from French rule. They were later reformed to become part of the Republic of Vietnam Military Forces when the Republic of Vietnam was established to replace the State of Vietnam on 26 October 1955. Before that France recognized full sovereignty of the State of Vietnam on 4 June 1954; a month later, the country lost the North to the communists.

The division was among the elite fighting forces in the ARVN and placed as a reserve unit along with the Republic of Vietnam Marine Division. Division headquarters was located at Tan Son Nhut Air Base near Saigon. The division would mobilize anywhere within the four corps at a moment's notice. The main use of the Airborne was to engage and destroy People's Army of Vietnam (PAVN) and Viet Cong (VC) forces, not hold a specific region like the infantry units.

=== 1964 ===
On 4 January a VC battalion massed near My Tinh An hamlet near the border with Định Tường province. The VC were soon surrounded by a Ranger company, two Civil Guard companies, and Self-Defense Corps elements. On the morning of the 5th the 8th Airborne Battalion supported by M113 armored personnel carriers attacked, but became bogged down. The Airborne withdrew and artillery and airstrikes hit the VC, with one airstrike accidentally hitting ARVN forces. By the morning of the 6th the VC had withdrawn leaving only one body, but radio intercepts and local villagers reported that the VC had evacuated about 100 corpses. The next day a shallow grave containing 41 VC dead was found. The ARVN lost ten killed and thirty-six wounded, with an M113 and seven aircraft damaged.

On 3 March the 1st and 8th Airborne Battalions commanded by Colonel Cao Văn Viên attempted to encircle the VC 502nd Battalion about 10 km north of Tan Chau, near the Cambodian border. Instead, at dawn the VC ambushed the Airborne from entrenched positions using automatic rifles, recoilless rifles, and mortars. Three more infantry battalions and artillery were deployed to support the Airborne. Restrictions on the use of aircraft near the border limited aerial support and the closeness of the combatants sometimes prevented the artillery from firing. The fighting raged until 09:00 when the VC broke contact and fled across the border. ARVN losses were 15 dead and 85 wounded, VC dead were estimated at 130.

On 14 March an airborne battalion and two ranger companies attempted to envelop two VC battalions near the Cai Cai canal. The operation killed 14 VC and captured 70.

On 21 June elements of the 7th and 9th Divisions massed eight battalions - five infantry, two airborne, and one Civil Guard, a battery of 105mm howitzers and two platoons of 155mm howitzers to encircle an area 15 km in diameter centered on the village of My Thien in western Định Tường province. Inside were an estimated 1,000 VC regulars of the 261st, the 502nd, and 514th Battalions, plus two additional companies. The operation began inauspiciously when an RVNAF A-1H fighter-bomber mistakenly attacked the 2nd Battalion, 15th Infantry, causing nine casualties. The major fighting started in the afternoon as the 3rd Airborne Battalion approached the hamlet of Bang Lang. The unit commander decided not to wait for artillery support and led his men in a bayonet charge across 137 meters of muddy paddy into the teeth of entrenched VC machine guns. The battle raged until dark, with fixed-wing aircraft conducting 14 strikes. VC gunners downed four U.S. helicopters. The VC successfully eluded capture that night and two additional days of searching achieved little. The South Vietnamese lost 29 dead and 85 wounded, VC dead numbered almost 100.

On 22 June the 1st and 3rd Airborne Battalions were on a search-and-destroy operation in support of the 7th Division near Bang Lang, Định Tường province, when they ran into the VC 261st and 514th Battalions. VC fire downed four US Army helicopters. US helicopter gunships lent their support to the fight, at one point accidentally inflicting nine casualties on the South Vietnamese. The paratroopers charging the VC multiple times. Hostile fire killed or wounded all nine platoon leaders in the 1st Battalion. The VC retreated at dusk after losing 58 killed, 26 captured and 20 weapons. The Airborne lost 29 killed and 89 wounded.

On 20 July three VC companies from the 261st, 263rd, and 514th Battalions attacked Cái Bè killing 12 Popular Force soldiers, ten women and 30 children. The ARVN deployed five battalions to engage the VC and the 6th and 8th Airborne Battalions saw intense fighting, losing 13 killed and 52 wounded. VC losses were 46 killed and 12 captured.

On 6 September the 7th Airborne Battalion entered a heavily fortified base near Phu Hoa, Binh Duong Province. The VC ambushed the paratroopers, then assaulted them, only to be repulsed. The paratroopers launched three successive counterattacks, none of which succeeded. By the end of the fight the airborne had lost seven killed and 39 wounded, VC losses were 30 killed.

From 18 to 22 November the ARVN mounted Operation Phong Hoa a 14+ battalion operation against VC bases in Boi Loi Woods, Long Nguyen Secret Zone and the Ho Bo Woods, an area covering more than 770 square km in Hau Nghia, Binh Duong, and Tay Ninh provinces. The initial operation in the Boi Loi Woods was regarded as a complete failure, with the VC C56 Regiment having already withdrawn from the area. On 20 November, VC hidden in tunnels ambushed the 3rd Airborne Battalion in an abandoned rubber plantation. ARVN losses were 22 dead, 67 wounded and one missing. VC losses were claimed as 168 killed and 68 captured.

=== 1965 ===
On 9 February two airborne battalions were deployed by US helicopters to two landing zones 24 km northeast of Binh Gia. The 6th Airborne Battalion met little resistance at Landing Zone Alpha, but the VC 272nd Regiment gave the first two companies of the 5th Airborne Battalion an unwelcome reception at Landing Zone Bravo northeast of the hamlet of Cu Bi, hitting 12 helicopters, downing three of them. As a fierce firefight developed, VC soldiers set the grass in the landing zone on fire. The forces at LZ Alpha moved overland towards Bravo arriving at 17:00 where they established a perimeter for the night. As darkness fell, the VC began a series of ground assaults interspersed with mortar bombardments. The fighting continued until dawn on the 10th when the VC withdrew. After evacuating its wounded and receiving resupply, the task force resumed its sweep, assisted on the 11th by the 7th Airborne Battalion. The VC avoided contact as the airborne uncovered a regimental hospital, a battalion training camp, and a supply dump. By the time Operation 21/Nguyen Van Nho ended, the VC had lost 91 killed and two soldiers and 36 weapons captured, including a 57mm recoilless rifle and two machine guns. The airborne lost 22 dead and 95 wounded. Three of the downed U.S. Army helicopters were destroyed. One American aviator died, and 11 others along with two advisers were wounded.

On 19 February as the 3rd Company, 11th Airborne Battalion searched Da Ngu 2 village near Vung Ro Bay, their US advisor was killed. The unit then stormed bunkers in the village and called in airstrikes that destroyed the village. VC losses were 54 killed and four captured. Allied losses were two killed and four wounded.

On 14 March two airborne companies were landed by US helicopters to raid a VC prisoner-of-war camp 56 km northwest of Qui Nhon. The troops killed seven VC and captured 11 more while liberating 35 ARVN prisoners. The VC had removed the two Americans living in the camp 12 hours before the raid.

On 31 March in Operation Quyet Thang 512 the division planned to sweep a 200 square km area near Viet An. After US helicopter gunships hit the wrong target, the VC were able to shoot down a US Army troop carrying helicopter as it approached the landing zone. Anticipating the assault, the VC engaged the troops of the 5th Airborne Battalion as they landed and hit many of the helicopters. At 14:00, the 2nd and 3rd Battalions, 5th Infantry, and M113s began moving toward the besieged airborne. The 3rd Battalion and the M113s got within 2 km of the airborne when the commander ordered the infantry to secure a small hill instead, leaving the M113s to continue to the landing zone. Meanwhile, the VC forced the 2nd Battalion to fall back. A half hour later, five RVNAF A-1s arrived to assist the 2nd Battalion and the airborne. The VC, however, staged a fierce attack on the 3rd Battalion, assisted by ARVN artillery that mistakenly hit the infantry. The 3rd Battalion broke, with the VC chasing the soldiers into an open field where they were dangerously exposed. Earlier reports had led Westmoreland to invoke his emergency powers and at the critical moment, F–100s and B–57s zoomed in at low level and hit the VC, saving the 3rd Battalion from possible annihilation. Throughout the night, the VC probed the 5th Airborne's perimeter. At 05:00 on 1 April, they launched an assault that failed. They then faded back into the jungle. ARVN losses were 21 dead, 66 wounded, and 20 missing and 32 individual and two crew-served weapons. The US lost two dead and 19 wounded. The VC shot down two one Army and one Marine Corps helicopters and damaged all the others used in the operation. The allies found 70 VC dead and estimated that they lost an additional 270 men. Nineteen individual weapons and one 57mm recoilless rifle were recovered.

On the afternoon of 10 June during the Battle of Đồng Xoài, the 7th Airborne Battalion was landed in Đồng Xoài to reinforce the defenders in the camp. The following day the battalion marched 4 km north into the Thuận Lợi rubber plantation where elements of the 1st Battalion, 7th Infantry Regiment, 2nd Division had been ambushed the previous day and they collected seven survivors and 55 bodies. In the afternoon, as elements of the battalion continued searching the plantation, the VC 271st Regiment started attacking them. Taking advantage of the poor weather conditions that had limited US airstrikes, as well as their numerical superiority, the VC broke the battalion into small groups and destroyed many of them. By 12 June, the strength of the 7th Airborne Battalion was reduced from 470 to just 159 soldiers.

On 30 June II Corps sent two airborne battalions, an infantry battalion, and some artillery to evacuate Thuan Man district, Phú Bổn province after the VC seized most of the surrounding area. As the column approached Thuan Man village a VC regiment attacked it from hills overlooking the road. The battle raged all day. The VC overran the task force headquarters and forced the infantry battalion out of the fight, but the airborne battalions held. Nightfall found the ARVN in a defensive perimeter and low on ammunition. Intelligence reported that the B–3 Front had another infantry regiment nearby ad the JGS sent a marine task force plus two airborne battalions to reinforce. On 1 July, the marines were able to reach the surrounded column. The allies decided to evacuate the Thuan Man garrison by helicopter, but VC fire proved too intense for the helicopters to land. The garrison then escaped by an unexpected route to the Buon Brieng special forces camp. ARVN losses were 30 dead, 59 wounded, 159 missing, and seven trucks destroyed. Four Americans died, and three suffered wounds. The VC lost 300 killed, but gained control over Thuan Man District.

On 11 December a United States Air Force (USAF) C-123B Provider #56-4376 crashed en route from Pleiku Air Base to Tuy Hoa Air Base killing all four USAF crewmen and 81 soldiers of the 7th Airborne Battalion on board. The remains of the crew and passengers were recovered, but the identities of the Airborne soldiers could not be established and they were kept at the Laboratory at Joint Base Pearl Harbor–Hickam for more than 30 years before being interred at the Vietnamese cemetery in Westminster, California in October 2019.

=== 1966 ===
From 4–7 March the 1st and 5th Airborne Battalions participated in Operation Utah with the 37th Ranger Battalion and elements of the US 1st Marine Division fighting the PAVN 21st Regiment northwest of Quảng Ngãi.

From 20 to 25 March the 5th Airborne Battalion participated in Operation Texas with the ARVN 2nd and 3rd Battalions, 5th Regiment, 2nd Division and elements of the US 1st Marine Division fighting elements of the PAVN 21st Regiment and VC 1st Regiment around Hill 141 northwest of Quảng Ngãi.

=== 1967 ===
On 4 August as part of Operation Greeley the 8th Airborne Battalion was deployed to aid the 1st Battalion, 42nd Regiment, 22nd Division which was locked in combat with a PAVN force on a hilltop west of Dak Seang Camp. After a three-day battle ARVN forces found 189 PAVN bodies, large quantities of ammunition and equipment, and a sophisticated regimental command post with training areas and an elaborate mock-up of the Dak Seang Camp.

=== 1968 ===
The Tết ceasefire began on 29 January, but was canceled on 30 January after the VC/PAVN prematurely launched their Tet Offensive attacks in II Corps and II Field Force, Vietnam commander, LG Frederick C. Weyand deployed his forces to defend Saigon. General Cao Văn Viên, chief of the Joint General Staff (JGS), ordered the 8th Airborne Battalion, which was to deploy north to Quảng Trị Province, to remain at Tan Son Nhut Air Base and the battalion participated in the defense of both the Tan Son Nhut Air Base and the Joint General Staff Compound. The 6th Airborne Battalion also late joined the fighting at the JGS Compound.

During the Battle of Hue, after resisting the initial PAVN/VC attacks on its Mang Ca Garrison headquarters on the morning of 31 January 1968, 1st Division commander General Ngô Quang Trưởng called in reinforcements including the 1st ARVN Airborne Task Force to relieve the pressure on Mang Ca. Responding to the call at PK-17 base 17 km north of Huế, the 3rd Troop and the 7th Battalion of the Airborne task force rolled out of their base area in an armored convoy onto Highway 1. A PAVN blocking force stopped the ARVN relief force about 400 meters short of the Citadel wall. Unable to force their way through the enemy positions, the Airborne asked for assistance. The 2nd Airborne Battalion then reinforced the convoy, and the ARVN finally penetrated the lines and entered the Citadel in the early morning hours of 1 February. The cost had been heavy: the ARVN suffered 131 casualties including 40 dead and lost four of the 12 armored personnel carriers in the convoy. The ARVN claimed to have killed 250 PAVN, captured five prisoners, and recovered 71 individual and 25 crew-served weapons. The ARVN would attempt to regain the Citadel while the Marines regained the new city south of the Perfume River. Within the Citadel the ARVN 1st Battalion, 3rd Regiment, and the 1st Airborne task force cleared out the north and western parts of the Citadel including Tây Lộc Airfield and the Chanh Tay Gate, while the 4th Battalion, 2nd Regiment moved south from Mang Ca towards the Imperial Palace, killing over 700 PAVN/VC by 4 February. On 5 February Trưởng exchanged the Airborne with the 4th Battalion, which had become stalled. On 11 February the Vietnamese Marines Task Force A comprising the 1st and 5th Battalions, began to be lifted by helicopter into Mang Ca to replace the Airborne, however, due to poor weather this deployment would not be completed until 13 February. The ARVN Airborne had withdrawn from the eastern wall of the Citadel when the Vietnamese Marines began to arrive at Mang Ca and the PAVN defenders had used this opportunity to reoccupy several blocks and reinforce their defenses.

At the start of the Battle of Quang Tri on 31 January, the 9th Airborne Battalion was deployed around Quảng Trị with one Airborne company bivouacked in Tri Buu village on the northern edge of the city with elements in the Citadel, and two Airborne companies positioned just south of the city in the area of a large cemetery where Highway 1 crosses Route 555. As the 600-man VC 814th Battalion, 324th Division was moving into position to attack Quảng Trị from the northeast, it unexpectedly encountered the 9th ARVN Airborne company in Tri Buu village, which engaged it in a sharp firefight lasting about 20 minutes. The Airborne company was nearly annihilated and an American adviser killed, but its stubborn resistance stalled the battalion's assault on the Citadel and the city. By 04:20, the PAVN's heavy pressure and overwhelming numbers forced the surviving Airborne soldiers to pull back into the city, and the 814th attacked and attempted to enter the Citadel unsuccessfully. At the same time the PAVN K6 Battalion, 812th Regiment encountered the Airborne forces in the cemetery south of the city preventing an attack on the ARVN 1st Infantry Regiment, 1st Division's La Vang Base. In the afternoon two companies of the US 1st Battalion, 5th Cavalry Regiment were landed southeast of Quảng Trị engaging the K6 Battalion from the rear in a heavy firefight, while Airborne troops blocked and attacked it from the direction of the city. US helicopter gunships and artillery hit the K6 Battalion hard causing significant further casualties. By nightfall on the 31st, the battered 812th Regiment decided to withdraw, though clashes continued throughout the night. Quảng Trị was clear of PAVN/VC troops by midday on 1 February, and ARVN units with U.S. air support had cleared Tri Buu Village of PAVN troops. The remnants of the 812th, having been hit hard by ARVN defenders and US airpower and ground troops on the outskirts of the city, particularly artillery and helicopters broke up into small groups, sometimes mingling with crowds of fleeing refugees, and began to exfiltrate the area, trying to avoid further contact with Allied forces. Between 31 January and 6 February, the Allies killed an estimated 914 PAVN/VC and captured another 86 in and around Quang Tri.

From 11 March to 7 April the division participated in Operation Quyet Thang in Gia Định Province with the Marine Brigade and the US 199th Light Infantry Brigade to reestablish South Vietnamese control over the areas immediately around Saigon in the aftermath of the Tet Offensive. On 26 March, east of Hóc Môn Airborne forces found 128 dead VC who had apparently been killed by air and artillery strikes while moving south towards Saigon.

From 8 April to 31 May, the 1st Airborne Task Force participated in Operation Toan Thang I to continue pressure on PAVN/VC forces in III Corps. The operation involved nearly every combat unit in III Corps. The operation was a success with allied forces claiming 7645 VC/PAVN killed, however, the operation did not prevent the VC/PAVN from launching their May Offensive attacks against Saigon.

From 20 April to 12 May, the 6th Airborne Battalion participated in Operation Delaware with the US 1st Cavalry Division.

During the May Offensive at 10:00 on 5 May the Airborne was engaged by VC north of Tan Son Nhut Air Base.

On 13 September during the Phase III Offensive, the VC 3rd Battalion, 272nd Regiment attacked Firebase Buell II. After a 600-round mortar barrage, the infantry attacked the base but were easily repulsed leaving 76 dead for no U.S. losses. The VC retreated west taking refuge in a hamlet southwest of Tây Ninh where they were engaged late that day by the 2nd Airborne Battalion who killed 150 VC for the loss of 9 dead and 17 wounded. After midnight on 20 September the 1st Battalion, 272nd Regiment, attacked a Regional Forces outpost in Phước Tân hamlet, 20 km west of Tay Ninh City, losing 35 killed in the brief assault. The 1st Marine Battalion was deployed to Phước Tân later that day to defend against any renewed assault. That evening the 271st Regiment attacked, the assault was repelled with air and artillery support, killing 128 VC with 6 captured. The 8th Airborne Battalion was also deployed to Phước Tân and on the night of 27 September the 272nd Regiment attacked again losing 150 killed.

From 3 December the 2nd Airborne Task Force participated in Operation Goodwood under the operational control of the 1st Australian Task Force. On 15 January 1969 the 1st Marine Battalion replaced the 2nd Airborne Task Force.

=== 1969–1971 ===
In June 1969 the new II Field Force, Vietnam commander Lt. Gen. Julian Ewell initiated the Dong Tien (or "Progress Together") Program with III Corps commander, General Đỗ Cao Trí, to "buddy up US and ARVN units to conduct combined operations [that would]... maximize the effectiveness of both forces [and] achieve in 2, 3, or 4 months a quantum jump in ARVN and RF/PF performance." The Airborne, now a complete nine-battalion division with three regimental and one division headquarters, artillery and supporting services, was still part of the general reserves under the supervision of the Joint General Staff, Saigon had never employed the force as an entire division and was still parceling it out in small multi-battalion task forces that continued to suffer more than their share of wear and tear. In contrast, other elements of the Airborne force, including the division headquarters and many of the support units, had seen little action in the field, rarely moving from their Tan Son Nhut base camp.

Something had to be done to revitalize this key unit that would someday have to serve as the mobile reserve force for the entire country, and in October 1969 Ewell nominated the US 1st Cavalry Division for the task. Since its arrival in III Corps in late 1968, the 1st Cavalry Division had been operating along the sparsely populated Cambodian border, engaging regular PAVN forces that ventured south across the frontier. Although the division had conducted a number of minor combined operations with assorted ARVN units, it had remained aloof from the main Dong Tien Program. However, the reduced amount of PAVN activity along the border during the second half of 1969 enabled Ewell to expand the missions of the airmobile unit.

In October and November representatives of II Field Force and III Corps met in a series of meetings at Trí's Bien Hoa headquarters, and laid out the ground rules for the Cavalry-Airborne Dong Tien operation. Trí emphasized the need for close coordination of commands and staffs at the division and brigade/regimental levels but felt that integrated operations at the battalion level were unnecessary. Presumably, the Airborne battalions were experienced enough to take care of themselves, but the Airborne brigade and division staffs needed much work. The Cavalry would have to make helicopters available and supply certain airmobile and communications equipment that the Vietnamese lacked. With these exceptions, the Vietnamese were to be in charge of their own operations, including their logistical needs.

Trí also wanted the Airborne Division to establish a forward headquarters with a full tactical operations center alongside the US division headquarters. Almost immediately the 2nd Airborne Brigade moved into War Zone C along the Cambodian border for combined operations with the 1st Cavalry Division's 1st Brigade. Operating from Tây Ninh City, the two Brigade commanders opened fire support bases across War Zone C for the three participating Airborne battalions. The ARVN bases, each housing one Airborne battalion, and a supporting artillery battery were staggered between 1st Brigade firebases, making US artillery support readily available. Initially, the commanders matched each Airborne battalion with a Cavalry unit, and Cavalry personnel gave Airborne troops and their advisers' elementary instruction in combat air assaults, extractions, and resupply. But the Cavalry units had relatively little to do with the day-to-day ground operations of the Airborne. Each Airborne battalion had its own area of operation and, supported by helicopters of the US 11th Combat Aviation Group, constantly patrolled their jungle zones. In December the Cavalry's 2nd Brigade began a similar program with the 1st Airborne Brigade east of War Zone C, in the Phước Bình border area. Ewell reinforced the Vietnamese and advisory communications systems with US forward observers, special liaison teams, and extra radios. This assistance, together with the overlapping artillery support and the close proximity of US airmobile infantry battalions, ensured that he could quickly aid the Vietnamese units should strong enemy forces be encountered, but despite Ewell's concern, such occasions never arose, and the Airborne operations were relatively uneventful.

After several months in the field, Trí rotated other airborne units through the 1st Cavalry Division's "training area" until the program ended in April 1970. The effort was a mixed success. As in similar programs, American air, communications, and logistical support enabled the South Vietnamese units to run extended operations well beyond their normal supply and support capabilities. However, the Airborne never operated as an entire division. Because the division commander, General Đống, failed to establish a tactical command post and rarely took to the field, his staff and support units benefited little. Americans still considered Đống a problem child and felt that the Airborne had significant weaknesses that Dong Tien had been unable to address. Nevertheless, the combined effort set the stage for more ambitious undertakings in Cambodia one month later.

On 1 May 1970 as part of Operation Toan Thang 43 (Total Victory), an early phase of the Cambodian Campaign, the 3rd Airborne Brigade together with other US forces crossed into Kampong Cham Province of Cambodia. The Airborne played a significant role in the campaign, with battalions participating in most of the individual operations and finding significant caches of supplies, alongside being the sole force dropped behind enemy lines to cut-off a potential retreat.

From 8 February to 25 March 1971 the 2nd Airborne Battalion and the 3rd Airborne Brigade Headquarters and the 3rd Airborne Battalion participated in Operation Lam Son 719. The two battalions developed firebases along Route 9 in Laos to serve as tripwires for any PAVN advance into the zone of the ARVN incursion. On 23 February the PAVN began shelling the 3rd Battalion's Fire Support Base 31. Airborne Division commander Đống had opposed stationing his elite paratroopers in static defensive positions and felt that his men's usual aggressiveness had been stifled. Vicious PAVN anti-aircraft fire made reinforcement and resupply of the firebase impossible. Đống then ordered elements of the 17th Armored Squadron to advance north from A Loui to reinforce the base. The armored force never arrived, due to conflicting orders that halted the armored advance several kilometers south of FSB 31. On 25 February the PAVN deluged the base with artillery fire and then launched a conventional armored/infantry assault. Smoke, dust, and haze precluded observation by an American forward air control (FAC) aircraft, which was flying above 4,000 feet (1,200 m) to avoid anti-aircraft fire. When a U.S. Air Force F-4 Phantom jet was shot down in the area, the FAC left the area of the battle to direct a rescue effort for the downed aircraft crew, sealing the fate of the base. PAVN troops and tanks then overran the position, capturing the ARVN brigade commander in the process. FSB 31 was secured by the PAVN at an estimated cost of 250 killed, and 11 PT-76 and T-54 tanks destroyed. The Airborne had suffered 155 killed and over 100 captured. the 2nd Battalion at Fire Support Base 30 lasted only about one week longer. Although the steepness of the hill on which the base was situated precluded armored attack, the PAVN artillery bombardment was very effective. By 3 March the base's six 105 mm and six 155 mm howitzers had been put out of action. In an attempt to relieve the firebase, ARVN armor and infantry of the 17th Cavalry moved out to save their comrades. Following the conclusion of the operation the Airborne were kept in I Corps instead of returning to their base in Saigon, presumably to prevent them spreading stories of the losses suffered in the operation.

=== Easter Offensive ===
In late February 1972 in response to intelligence reports of a PAVN buildup including tanks and artillery in the Central Highlands, the 2nd Airborne Brigade was placed under the control of II Corps and deployed to secure a string of firebases along a backbone of mountains stretching south-west from Tân Cảnh Base Camp towards Kontum nicknamed Rocket Ridge. In the first week of March another Airborne Brigade and the division's tactical command post were deployed to defend Kontum city and the south of Kontum Province, these were the last available reserves in South Vietnam.

On the morning of 3 April Firebase Delta 25 km northwest of Kontum, defended by one company of Airborne and one of Rangers came under attack by the PAVN 52nd Regiment, the assault was repulsed using intensive tactical airstrikes and the PAVN suffered 353 killed. On 21 April the PAVN launched an assault on Firebase Delta by three tanks supported by infantry and by the evening had succeeded in overrunning the base. From 23 to 24 April the PAVN overran the main ARVN bases at Tân Cảnh and Đắk Tô Base Camp. With the loss of these camps, the remaining firebases along Rocket Ridge were abandoned and the PAVN had a clear approach to Kontum.

During the Battle of An Lộc on 15 April 1972, the 1st Airborne Brigade was lifted by helicopters into An Lộc to support the besieged garrison. After the initial direct assaults on the town had been repulsed, the PAVN bombarded the town and gradually reduced the defensive line, while all the time being battered by US and South Vietnamese airstrikes. On 11 May the PAVN 5th and 9th Divisions launched a massive all-out infantry and armor assault on An Lộc, suffering severe losses to airstrikes but further squeezing the defenders. Another assault on 12 May failed to take the city. The PAVN launched a final attack on 19 May in honor of Ho Chi Minh's birthday. The attack was broken up by U.S. air support and an ambush by the Airborne. After the attacks of 11 and 12 May the PAVN directed its main efforts to cut off any more relief columns. However, by 9 June this proved ineffective, and the defenders were able to receive the injection of manpower and supplies needed to sweep the surrounding area of PAVN and by 18 June the battle was over and the 1st Airborne Brigade was released to Division command.

Following the defeat of the ARVN in Quảng Trị Province in the initial phase of the Easter Offensive, on 2 May 1972 the remnants of the 3rd Division, the 147th and 258th Marine Brigades and the 1st Division established a new defensive line along the Mỹ Chánh River northwest of Huế. On 3 May I Corps commander General Hoàng Xuân Lãm was replaced by Lieutenant general Ngô Quang Trưởng, commander of IV Corps and this change of command and reinforcement by forces of the general reserve stabilized the ARVN position in Thừa Thiên Province. The remainder of the Marine Division was deployed to Huế and was given responsibility for north and northwest Thừa Thiên Province, while the 1st Division was given responsibility for the area southwest and south of Huế blocking any further PAVN advance from the A Sầu Valley. On 8 May the 2nd Airborne Brigade arrived at Huế and came under the operational control of the Marine Division on the My Chanh Line. The entire division arrived in late May and was given responsibility for a sector between the Marine Division and the 1st Division.

From 11 to 18 June the division and the Marine Division conducted probing attacks to test PAVN strength ahead of the launch of Trưởng's Operation Lam Son 72 to recapture Quảng Trị Province. The operational plan called for the Airborne and Marine Divisions to advance abreast to the northwest to the Thạch Hãn River. The division would deploy to the west from the foothills to Highway 1, while the Marine Division would deploy to the east from Highway 1 to the coast. Quảng Trị City would be in the division's operational area, but the plan called for the city to be bypassed so as to concentrate on the destruction of PAVN forces. On 28 June the South Vietnamese advance began and quickly ran into strong PAVN resistance and helicopter assaults were launched to land troops behind PAVN positions. By 7 July the division had reached the southern outskirts of Quảng Trị City, but then President Thiệu intervened in the operation. Trưởng had planned to bypass the city and push on quickly to the Cua Viet River, thereby isolating any PAVN defenders. Thiệu, however, now demanded that Quảng Trị be taken immediately, seeing the city as "a symbol and a challenge" to his authority. The division's assault bogged down in the outskirts and the PAVN, apprised of the plans for the offensive, moving the 304th and 308th Divisions to the west to avoid the U.S. airpower that was about to be unleashed upon Quảng Trị. On 27 July, the Marine Division was ordered to relieve the division as the lead element in the battle. The citadel was finally captured on 15 September.

In 1972 Thiệu finally moved Đống out of the division which he had commanded since September 1964, appointing him to command the Capital Military District and replacing him with General Le Quang Luong who had performed well at An Lộc.

From August to 3 November 1974 the 1st and 3rd Airborne Brigades fought the PAVN 304th Division in the Battle of Thượng Đức. The Airborne lost 500 dead and more than 2,000 wounded, severely weakening the strength of this elite unit at a crucial time, while PAVN casualties were estimated to exceed 7,000 and the 304th Division was rendered combat ineffective.

=== 1975 ===
In late December 1974 Trưởng took advantage of the temporary calm to pull the 2nd Airborne Brigade out of the line west of Huế, placing it in reserve in Phú Lộc District.

The initial PAVN attacks in Quảng Trị Province struck Regional Force outposts and strongpoints in the foothills and the hamlets of the coastal lowlands. By 8 March, PAVN and local VC were in control of seven hamlets in Hải Lăng District and in southern Quảng Trị and northern Thừa Thiên Provinces, and refugees streamed southward, until nearly the entire population of Quảng Trị Province, as many as 100,000, traveled the road to Huế. With tanks and armored personnel carriers, an ARVN task force composed of the 8th Airborne Battalion, the 112th and 120th RF Battalions, and the 921st RF Company, succeeded in driving the enemy from nearly all populated areas by afternoon on 9 March. PAVN/VC casualties were heavy and ARVN losses few in this opening phase.

On 11 March a battalion of the PAVN 6th Regiment infiltrated through Phú Lộc, and two of its companies seized 12 fishing boats, which ferried them across Dam Cau Hai Bay to Vinh Loc Island. There they attacked Vinh Hien Village on the southern tip of the island and swept north to attack Vinh Giang. Some of the battalion pushed into Phu Thu District east of Huế. The 8th Airborne Battalion, reinforced with two companies of the 1st Battalion, 54th Infantry, and a troop of armored cavalry, moved against the PAVN battalion and badly mauled and dispersed it. On the same day, PAVN artillery-supported infantry assaults were launched against the 3rd Division, Airborne Division and territorial positions from Đại Lộc to Quế Sơn. Nearly all these assaults were repelled with heavy PAVN losses.

On 12 March, General Trưởng received the JGS order to pull the Airborne Division out of the line and start it moving to Saigon. The deployment was to begin on 17 March. Trưởng immediately called Viên to protest the decision but learned that Thiệu had personally directed the deployment so that the Airborne Division could participate in the offensive to retake Ban Me Thuot. Viên told Trưởng that, if possible, two battalions of the new 468th Marine Brigade and a Ranger group would be sent north to replace the Airborne Division. To adjust to the loss of the Airborne Division, Trưởng decided to pull the Marine Division out of Quảng Trị and northern Thua Thien Provinces and shift it south to cover Phú Lộc District and Da Nang. I Corps was to defend Huế and Da Nang, even if it had to give up Quang Tri, Quang Tin, and Quang Ngai Provinces. Trưởng and General Thi agreed, however, that their ability to hold Huế after the Marine Division moved south was questionable indeed. Trưởng flew to Saigon on 13 March to participate in a secret meeting with Thiệu, Prime Minister Trần Thiện Khiêm and Viên during which Trưởng was told about the evacuation from the Central Highlands and ordered to prepare a plan for the eventual evacuation of I Corps. He also was permitted to delay the first airborne brigade's departure to 18 March and the rest of the division until 31 March. Thiệu's reasoning was that Da Nang was most important, but that the rest of the region could be sacrificed. He would send the 468th Marine Brigade north to help defend Da Nang as soon as the Airborne Division arrived in Saigon. This division was vital to the defense of III and IV Corps, without which South Vietnam could no longer survive.

On 15 March, the 14th Ranger Group was to begin the relief of the 369th Marine Brigade in Quảng Trị Province. While one marine brigade would remain in the Song Bo Valley for the defense of Hue, the 369th Marine Brigade would deploy to Đại Lộc District in Quảng Nam Province, and relieve the 3rd Airborne Brigade for movement to Saigon.

On 17 March the 258th Marine Brigade pulled out of Quảng Trị to relieve the 2nd Airborne Brigade in southern Thừa Thiên and on 18 March the 2nd Airborne Brigade moved to the Da Nang docks for shipment to Saigon.

While the entire division was to move the Saigon, the 3rd Airborne Brigade was diverted at Nha Trang and sent to support the 23rd Division blocking the PAVN advance at Khanh Duong.The 3rd Airborne Brigade dug in on the high ground in the Cả Pass, behind the 40th Regiment. When the PAVN 10th Division supported by tanks forced their way through the 40th Regiment at Khanh Duong the Airborne held their positions. On 30 March the PAVN 10th Division supported by the 40th Artillery Regiment and with two companies of tanks attached, attacked the Airborne positions. On 31 March elements of the 28th and 66th Regiments, the next day surrounded the 5th Airborne Battalion which was reduced by casualties to 20 percent strength. The 3rd Airborne Brigade was deployed in depth from Chu Kroa Mountain south for about 15 km along the high ground over the Route 21. Heavy PAVN fire knocked out five of 14 armored personnel carriers supporting the brigade and the three 105 mm. howitzer batteries in the force had to move to the rear, setting up near Buon Ea Thi, beyond supporting range of the forward Airborne positions. The collapse of the Airborne defense proceeded very rapidly afterward. At Buon Ea Thi elements of the 10th Division outflanked Airborne positions along the road and struck the 6th Airborne Battalion. Although the troopers knocked out three T-54 tanks, they could not hold. With the brigade split at Buon Ea Thi, a rapid withdrawal was imperative to conserve what was left of the decimated force. The 3rd Airborne Brigade, less than one-fourth of its soldiers still in ranks, marched back through Dục Mỹ Camp and Ninh Hòa and stopped in a narrow defile where Route 1 edged along the beach below Han Son Mountain, just north of Nha Trang with the 10th Division close behind. On 1 April, PAVN tanks rolled through Dục Mỹ and Ninh Hòa and headed for Nha Trang. The II Corps staff drove south to Phan Rang Air Base, the defeated remnants of the Airborne, Rangers, Regional and Popular Forces and 40th Regiment followed. The RVNAF evacuated Nha Trang Air Base at 15:00 and all flyable aircraft were flown out. On the morning of 3 April the RVNAF at Phan Rang launched a heliborne operation comprising more than 40 UH-1s and six CH-47s escorted by A-37s to rescue the remnants of the 2nd, 5th and 6th Airborne Battalions that had been cut off at the M'Đrăk Pass successfully evacuating over 800 soldiers.

From 7 to 8 April the 2nd Airborne Brigade flew into Phan Rang to replace the remnants of the 3rd Airborne Brigade which moved back to Saigon. On 8 April the 3rd Airborne Battalion cleared Highway 1 and recaptured the villages of Bà Râu (11.7188°N 109.063°E) and Ba Thap (11.68°N 109.038°E) from the VC and the 11th Airborne Battalion then deployed by helicopters to recapture Du Long town (11.781°N 109.078°E) and the Du Long Pass (11.793°N 109.092°E), meanwhile the 5th Airborne Battalion secured the area around Phan Rang AB and cleared Route 11. On 11 April the 5th Airborne Battalion was withdrawn to Saigon and on 12 April the rest of the 2nd Airborne Brigade was ordered to withdraw to Saigon. On 13 April the 31st Rangers arrived by air from Bien Hoa while the ARVN 4th and 5th Regiments of the reformed 2nd Division arrived by road from Phan Thiết to replace the Airborne. The 31st Rangers deployed to Du Long to replace the 11th Airborne Battalion on the evening of 13 April. The PAVN meanwhile had decided to eliminate Phan Rang and at 05:30 on 14 April the PAVN 3rd Division began an artillery attack on the 31st Rangers at Du Long Pass and the 3rd Airborne at Bà Râu. At 06:30 PAVN tanks and infantry attacked to 31st Rangers' position but were forced back. At 07:00 two A-37s accidentally bombed the Rangers. The PAVN then bypassed the Rangers and attacked Du Long Town quickly defeating the Regional Forces there and outflanking the 31st Rangers at the pass. Reinforcements from the 52nd Rangers were sent to support the 31st Rangers but they were unable to break through and at 16:00 the 31st Rangers were ordered to withdraw with only 80 Rangers successfully returning to Phan Rang AB. At the same time as the attack on Du Long, the PAVN 25th Regiment infiltrated to attack Phan Rang AB. Despite helicopter gunship fire they successfully penetrated the base and headed for the hangar area where they were met by the 11th Airborne Battalion awaiting transport back to Saigon and four M113 armored personnel carriers which together with air support from the helicopter gunships and A-37s forced the PAVN back outside the perimeter, killing over 100 for the loss of six ARVN killed and one M113 destroyed. At dawn on 15 April the PAVN shelled the 3rd Airborne Battalion at Bà Râu and Kien Kien (11.704°N 109.0595°E) on Route 1 and then attacked their position. Although outnumbered, the Airborne held back the assault until midday when it blew the highway bridge and then withdrew onto Ca Dau mountain to the east. At 02:00 on 16 April an RVNAF EC-47 intercepted a PAVN radio transmission indicating an armored attack on Phan Rang would start at 05:00. A-37 aircraft were launched to attack PAVN positions along Route 1 and at 03:00 reconnaissance reported a large PAVN force moving through the Du Long Pass. Meanwhile, VC forces began attacking the base perimeter and on Ca Dau Mountain. At 05:00 the PAVN artillery bombardment commenced and this was soon followed by an armored spearhead of 20 tanks and armored personnel carriers of the 4th Battalion, 203rd Tank Brigade supported by truck-mounted infantry of the 101st Regiment and anti-aircraft guns. While the lead tank was destroyed by an ARVN rocket, the PAVN force quickly cut through the 3rd Airborne platoon holding Kien Kien. The RVNAF at the base mounted numerous airstrikes on the armored column, destroying vehicles and taking losses from the anti-aircraft fire and by 08:00 the armored vehicles were on the outskirts of the city. However the truck-mounted infantry had dispersed to avoid the airstrikes and the anti-aircraft vehicles had not kept up with the advance, leaving the 101st Regiment vulnerable to further air attacks which destroyed or damaged another 16 vehicles and killing numerous PAVN soldiers. The PAVN 3rd Division then attacked the Airborne troops on Ca Dau Mountain and allowed the 101st Regiment to resume its advance. After overcoming a Regional Force roadblock on the outskirts of the city for the loss of two tanks and many infantry, the PAVN pushed into the city capturing the Provincial Headquarters. By 09:30 the PAVN had captured the port and a bridge on Route 1 south of the city sealing off all sea and land escape routes. At 08:45 a battalion-sized PAVN mechanized force attacked along Route 11 towards the base. While one element attacked the 5th Regiment defending Route 11, the other moved around it to attack the base directly and at the same time, the 25th Regiment attacked the north of the base. The 5th Regiment soon broke and ran allowing the PAVN to attack the base's main gate while the 25th Regiment penetrated the north perimeter with explosives and captured the bomb storage area. The Airborne attempted a counterattack against the 25th Regiment, but were forced back and then squeezed between the PAVN and by 09:30 the PAVN had captured the base. Lieutenant general Nguyễn Vĩnh Nghi ordered his remaining forces to retreat from the base to the Ca Na peninsula (11.3455°N 108.877°E) 19 miles (31 km) south of the base and after cutting through the perimeter fence a large group of RVNAF, ARVN, and South Vietnamese civilians fled the base joining up with the 11th Airborne outside the base. At midnight on 17 April, the Airborne attacked a PAVN force on Route 11, but in the confusion of the attack Nghi and his command group became separated and at 02:00 were captured by the PAVN.

On 11 April the 1st Airborne Brigade was deployed south of Xuân Lộc District and began moving north to support the 18th Division fighting the Battle of Xuân Lộc. The brigade made slow progress against a determined PAVN defense, and on 19 April the JGS ordered a general withdrawal from Xuân Lộc. The brigade withdrew through the plantations and jungles toward Bà Rịa in Phước Tuy Province, where it would defend until South Vietnamese President Dương Văn Minh ordered the armed forces to stop fighting at 10:24 on 30 April.

On the morning of 30 April, PAVN sappers attempted to seize the Newport Bridge over the Saigon River, one of the last obstacles on the approach to Saigon, but were repulsed by the 12th Airborne Battalion. At 09:00, the PAVN 203rd Tank Battalion column approached the bridge and came under fire from ARVN tanks, which destroyed the lead T-54, killing the PAVN battalion commander. The ARVN and PAVN continued to exchange tank and artillery fire until 10:24, when the ARVN commander received Minh's capitulation order over the radio. While the bridge was rigged with approximately 4000 lbs of demolition charges, the ARVN stood down, and at 10:30 the PAVN column crossed the bridge.

== Airborne brigade and divisional commanders ==
- Đỗ Cao Trí (1954–1955)
- Nguyễn Văn Vỹ
- Cao Văn Viên (1960–1964)
- Ngô Quang Trưởng
- Nguyễn Khánh
- Dư Quốc Đống
- Nguyễn Chánh Thi (1955–1960)
- Nguyễn Khoa Nam
- Đoàn Văn Quảng
- Lê Quang Lưỡng

== Structure and organization ==
=== Airborne Advisory Detachment ===
Like all major ARVN units, the Airborne was assigned a U.S. military advisory element, originally the Airborne Brigade Advisory Detachment, and later redesignated the 162nd Airborne Advisory Detachment or U.S. Airborne Advisory Team 162. About 1,000 American airborne-qualified advisors served with the brigade and division, receiving on average two awards for valor per tour; over the years, they were able to build and maintain a good working relationship with their Vietnamese counterparts and airborne units, a situation unfortunately not always found in other ARVN formations. U.S. officers were paired with their Vietnamese counterparts, from the Brigade/Division commander down to company commanders, as well as with principal staff officers at all levels. U.S. NCOs assisted the staff and company advisors.

=== Units ===
- Colonial units
  - 1st Indochinese Parachute Company (1ére CIP)
  - 3rd Indochinese Parachute Company (3e CIP)
  - 5th Indochinese Parachute Company (5e CIP)
  - 7th Indochinese Parachute Company (7e CIP)
  - 1st Airborne Guard Company (1ére CPGVN)
  - 3rd Vietnamese Parachute Battalion (3e BPVN)
  - 5th Vietnamese Parachute Battalion (5e BPVN)
  - 6th Vietnamese Parachute Battalion (6e BPVN)
  - 7th Vietnamese Parachute Battalion (7e BPVN)
  - 3rd Vietnamese Parachute Engineers Company (3ére CPGVN)
- Airborne Group units
  - Headquarters & Headquarters Company (HHC)
  - 1st Airborne Battalion (1 TDND)
  - 3rd Airborne Battalion (3 TDND)
  - 5th Airborne Battalion (5 TDND)
  - 6th Airborne Battalion (6 TDND)
  - Airborne Combat Support Battalion
- Airborne Brigade units
  - Headquarters & Headquarters Company
- 1st Task Force HQ
  - 1st Airborne Battalion (1 TDND)
  - 6th Airborne Battalion (6 TDND)
  - 7th Airborne Battalion (7 TDND)
- 2nd Task Force HQ
  - 3rd Airborne Battalion (3 TDND)
  - 5th Airborne Battalion (5 TDND)
  - 8th Airborne Battalion (8 TDND)
- Airborne Combat Support Battalion
- Airborne Division units
  - Headquarters Battalion
  - U.S. Airborne Advisory Team 162
- 1st Task Force/Brigade HHC
  - 1st Airborne Battalion (1 TDND)
  - 8th Airborne Battalion (8 TDND)
  - 9th Airborne Battalion (9 TDND)
  - 1st Airborne Artillery Battalion
- 2nd Task Force/Brigade HHC
  - 5th Airborne Battalion (5 TDND)
  - 7th Airborne Battalion (7 TDND)
  - 11th Airborne Battalion (11 TDND)
  - 2nd Airborne Artillery Battalion
- 3rd Task Force/Brigade HHC
  - 2nd Airborne Battalion (2 TDND)
  - 3rd Airborne Battalion (3 TDND)
  - 6th Airborne Battalion (6 TDND)
  - 3rd Airborne Artillery Battalion
- 4th Task Force/Brigade HHC
  - 4th Airborne Battalion (4 TDND)
  - 10th Airborne Battalion (10 TDND)
- Division Troops
  - Airborne Signal Battalion
  - Airborne Support Battalion
  - Airborne Medical Battalion
  - Airborne Reconnaissance Company/Battalion
  - Airborne Engineer Company/Battalion

== Weapons and equipment ==
The South Vietnamese airborne forces used the standard weaponry and equipment of French and U.S. origin issued to ANV and ARVN units. Paratrooper companies also fielded crew-served heavy weapons, such as mortars and recoilless rifles, whilst divisional artillery batteries were provided with Howitzers.

- M1917 revolver
- Smith & Wesson Model 10 revolver
- MAS-35-S pistol (7.65mm Longue)
- Colt.45 M1911A1 pistol
- Smith & Wesson Model 39 pistol
- MAT-49 submachine gun
- M1A1 Thompson submachine gun
- M3A1 submachine gun
- M1A1 carbine
- M2 carbine
- M1 Garand rifle
- MAS-36CR39 folding-stock Bolt-action rifle
- M16A1 rifle
- CAR-15 Assault carbine
- FM 24/29 light machine gun
- M1918A2 BAR light machine gun
- M60 machine gun
- M1919 Browning machine gun
- M2 Browning heavy machine gun
- M72 LAW anti-tank rocket launcher
- M79 grenade launcher
- M2 mortar 60 mm
- M19 mortar 60 mm
- M29 mortar 81 mm
- Brandt Mle 27/31 mortar 81 mm
- M67 recoilless rifle 90 mm
- 3.5 inch M20A1 Super Bazooka
- M101A1 105 mm towed field howitzer
- M102 105 mm light towed field howitzer
- Hurricane Aircat airboat patrol boat

== See also ==
- ARVN
- Army of the Republic of Vietnam Special Forces (LLDB)
- First Indochina War
- MIKE Force
- Republic of Vietnam Military Forces
- Royal Lao Army Airborne
- Vietnamese National Army (ANV)
- Vietnam War
- Weapons of the Vietnam War
