= 1st Vietnamese Parachute Battalion =

The 1st Vietnamese Parachute Battalion (Fr: 1er bataillon de parachutistes vietnamiens) was a French-Vietnamese paratroop battalion formed in Saigon, French Indochina on May 1, 1951.

== Operational history ==
The 1st Vietnamese Parachute Battalion (1 BPVN) was one of five battalions of Vietnamese paratroopers raised by the French Army between 1951 and 1957 as part of General Jean de Lattre de Tassigny's policy to establish a Vietnamese Army. Its cadre was drawn from two existing Vietnamese parachute companies, including 1st Indochina Parachute Company and 1st Company of the South Vietnamese Defense (1st Escadron Parachutiste Garde du Việt Nam Sud under Lieutenant Haynin) and volunteer soldiers from 1st Guards Company and from 1st Colonial Commando Parachute Battalion (1 BCCP).

The battalion participated in:

- Operation Pirate - August/September 1951
- Operation Bretagne - December 1951
- Operation Chaumière - April 1952
- Operation Éole - May 1952
- Operation Cabestan - June 1952
- Operation Quadrille - July 1952
- Battle of Nà Sản - end of 1952 / beginning of 1953
- Operation Atlas : April 1953
- Operation Quercy : November 1953

== General references ==
- Histoire des parachutistes français: De la Seconde Guerre mondiale à la guerre d'Indochine. Société de production littéraire. 1975.

== See also ==
- 3rd Vietnamese Parachute Battalion
- 5th Vietnamese Parachute Battalion
- 6th Vietnamese Parachute Battalion
- 7th Vietnamese Parachute Battalion
- 1st Cambodian Parachute Regiment
- 1st Laotian Parachute Battalion
