= Operation Camargue =

1953 French operation in the First Indochina War

- Part of the First Indochina War
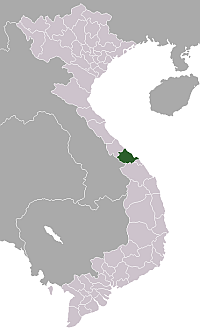
- Thừa Thiên-Huế Province
Date	28 July – 10 August 1953 (1 week and 6 days)
Location	French Indochina
Result	French Union victory

Belligerents
French Union: France; French Indochina; State of Vietnam	Democratic Republic of Vietnam: (North Vietnam) Việt Minh

Commanders and leaders
Georges Leblanc	Trần Quý Hai

Strength
~10,000	One infantry regiment

Casualties and losses
17 dead, 100 wounded	French est.: 600 killed or wounded, 900 captured Bernard Fall records: 182 killed and 387 prisoners The Times est.: 200 killed, 1,350 wounded or captured

Operation Camargue was one of the largest operations by the French Far East Expeditionary Corps and Vietnamese National Army in the First Indochina War. It took place from 28 July until 10 August 1953. French armored platoons, airborne units and troops delivered by landing craft to the coast of central Annam, modern-day Vietnam, attempted to sweep forces of the communist Viet Minh from the critical Route 1.

The first landings took place in the early morning on 28 July, and reached the first objectives, an inland canal, without major incident. A secondary phase of mopping-up operations began in a "labyrinth of tiny villages" where French armored forces suffered a series of ambushes. Reinforced by paratroopers, the French and their Vietnamese allies tightened a net around the defending Viet Minh, but delays in the movement of French forces left gaps through which most of the Viet Minh guerillas, and many of the arms caches the operation was expected to seize, escaped. For the French, this validated the claim that it was impossible to operate tight ensnaring operations in Vietnam's jungle, due to the slow movement of their troops, and a foreknowledge by the enemy, which was difficult to prevent. From then on, the French focused on creating strong fortified positions, against which Viet Minh General Giáp could pit his forces, culminating in Operation Castor and the Battle of Dien Bien Phu.

With the French forces withdrawn from the operation by the late summer of 1953, Viet Minh Regiment 95 re-infiltrated Route 1 and resumed ambushes of French convoys, retrieving weapons caches missed by the French forces. Regiment 95 occupied the area for the remainder of the First Indochina War and were still operating there as late as 1962 against the South Vietnamese Army during the Second Indochina, or Vietnam War.

== Background ==
The First Indochina War had raged, as guerrilla warfare, since 19 December 1946. From 1949, it evolved into conventional warfare, due largely to aid from the communists of the People's Republic of China ("PRC") to the north. Subsequently, the French strategy of occupying small, poorly defended outposts throughout Indochina, particularly along the Vietnamese-Chinese border, started failing. Thanks to the terrain, popular support for August Revolution and support for decolonization from bordering China and the U.S.S.R., the Viet Minh had succeeded in turning a "clandestine guerrilla movement into a powerful conventional army", following asymmetric warfare theory laid by Mao Tse Tung, something which previously had never been encountered by the western colonial powers. In October 1952, fighting around the Red River Delta spread into the Thai Highlands, resulting in the Battle of Nà Sản, at which the Viet Minh were defeated. The French used the lessons learned at Nà Sản – strong ground bases, versatile air support, and a model based on the British Burma Campaign – as the basis for their new strategy. The Viet Minh, however, remained unbeatable in the highland regions of Vietnam, and the French "could not offset the fundamental disadvantages of a roadbound army facing a hill and forest army in a country which had few roads but a great many hills and forests".

In May 1953, General Henri Navarre arrived to take command of the French forces, replacing General Raoul Salan. Navarre spoke of a new offensive spirit in Indochina – based on strong, fast-moving forces – and the media quickly took Operation Camargue to be the "practical realization" of that.

=== Chinese and American backing ===
Following the Communist victory in the Chinese Civil War in 1949, the Viet Minh established close ties with China. It enabled the Chinese to expand their area of influence into Indochina and the Viet Minh to receive much-needed Chinese equipment and strategic planning support. From mid-1950, PRC military advisers were seconded to the Viet Minh at battalion, regimental and divisional levels. The common border meant that "China became a 'sanctuary' where the Viet Minh could be trained and refitted". When the Korean War broke out, Indochina became "an important pawn in Cold War strategy". In December 1950, the United States, concerned about growing Chinese Communist influence, started providing military aid to the French, with a first payment of US$15 million.

In the spring of 1953, the Viet Minh launched campaigns in Laos and succeeded in linking up Laotian territorial gains with their bases in north-western Vietnam. Meanwhile, the winding down of the Korean War meant that China was able "to give much more attention to its southern neighbour". Similarly, the US "released from its heavy burden in the Korean conflict ... dramatically increased its military and financial support" to the French. By June 1953, the US "had sent: 1,224 tanks and combat vehicles; 120,792 rifles and machine guns; more than 200 million rifle and machine gun cartridges; more than five million artillery projectiles; 302 boats and 304 aircraft" (by end of the war, total US aid amounted to nearly four billion dollars).

== Prelude to the battle ==
A model of a typical Viet Minh ambush, using information from Bernard Fall's Street Without Joy, 1961

Route One, also known as Route Coloniale One (or RC1), had been the main north–south artery along the coastline of Vietnam since the outbreak of violence in 1949. Communications and convoys along these lines suffered from regular attacks by Viet Minh irregulars, despite efforts by the French during 1952 in Operation Sauterelle. The Viet Minh paramilitary forces around Route One originated mainly from a region of fortified villages dispersed along sand dunes and salt marshes between Hué to the south, and Quang Tri to the north. French forces had suffered from Viet Minh ambushes, an attack that the latter had become very proficient at throughout the war, most notably in the annihilation of Group Mobile 42 in 1950 and of GM 100 in 1954. The roads in Vietnam were almost all closed during the night and "abandoned to the enemy". Between 1952 and 1954, 398 armored vehicles were destroyed, 84% of them from mines and booby traps. Typically, the Viet Minh ambushed convoys by obstructing the road with a fallen tree or pile of boulders, and then destroying the first and last vehicles of the halted convoy with remote mines. Caltrops, mines and the steep cliff faces naturally found at the road side aided in funneling the target convoy into a small area, where machine guns, mortars and recoilless rifles were trained. Viet Minh Regiment 95 repeatedly deployed these tactics, inflicting severe losses on the French forces passing along Route One, which led to its French nickname of la rue sans joie ("the Street Without Joy"). Regiment 95 was, along with regiments 18 and 101, part of the Viet Minh Division 325, commanded by Colonel Trần Quý Hai. The division was formed in 1951 from pre-existing units in Thừa Thiên just north of Route One, and became operational in the summer of 1952.

By early summer 1953, thanks in part to the wind-down of hostilities in the Korean War, the French command had "sufficient reserves" at hand to begin clearing the Viet Minh back from Route One. They assembled 30 battalions, two armored regiments and two artillery regiments for one of the largest operations of the conflict. Called Operation Camargue, it was named for the sandy marshland to the west of Marseille, France. The difficult terrain was to prove the decisive factor and gave a major advantage to the one Viet Minh regiment tasked with defending Route One.

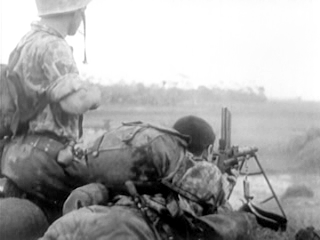
French soldiers fight off a Viet Minh ambush in 1952. The ambushes cost the French nearly 400 armoured vehicles between 1952 and 1954.

From a 100-meter (109 yd) deep beach of "hard sand" the French landing forces were to advance through a series of dunes. The dunes were up to 20 meters (22 yd) high and interspersed with precipices, ditches and a handful of small villages. Beyond this was an 800-meter (875 yd) belt of pagodas and temples, which war correspondent Bernard Fall described as having excellent defensive potential. Beyond these temples was Route One itself with a series of closely packed and fortified villages, including Tân An, Mỹ Thủy, Van Trinh and Lai-Ha. This network of villages and hedgerows made both ground and air surveillance difficult. Across from Route One the villages continued amid an area of quicksand, swamps and bogs, which would stop all but a few of the vehicles at the disposal of the French. Although there were roads, most were mined or damaged. Throughout the area, the civilian population remained and provided a further complication for the French high command.

=== French order of battle ===
... ten infantry regiments, two airborne battalions, the bulk of three armored regiments, one squadron of armored launches and one armored train, four artillery battalions, thirty-four transport aircraft, six reconnaissance aircraft and twenty-two fighter bombers, and about twelve Navy ships, including three LST's—this force was not inferior in size to some of those used in landing operations in World War II in the Pacific.

— Bernard Fall, Street Without Joy, 1961. p. 144.

The French divided their forces into four groupement mobiles ("mobile groups"): A through D. Group A consisted of Mobile Group 14, which contained 3rd Amphibious Group, 2nd Marine Commando, 2nd Battalion 1st Colonial Parachute Regiment, and 3rd Vietnamese Parachute Battalion. Operation Camargue was to be one of the final proving grounds for the use of French armour during the war. It was to land on the beach in line with the center of Route One. Meanwhile, Group B was to advance over land from the west of the north-east facing beach. This group consisted of Mobile Group Central Vietnam's 6th Moroccan Spahis, 2nd Amphibious Group, a tank platoon from 1st Foreign Cavalry Regiment, and two infantry companies from the Quang-Tri military base. Group C was to advance from the south-west into the back of Van Trinh through the swamps, and consisted of the 9th Moroccan Tabor, 27th Vietnamese Infantry Battalion, 2nd Battalion of the 4th Moroccan Rifle Regiment, 1 Commando, a tank platoon of the Moroccan Colonials, an armoured patrol boat platoon, and an LCM platoon. Group D consisted of 3rd Battalion of the 3rd Algerian Rifles, the 7th Amphibious Group, and a commando group, and was to land at the south-east end of the beach, below Group A. These forces in total formed "two amphibious forces, three land-borne groupments and one airborne force" all of which was commanded by General Leblanc.

== Securing Route One ==
=== French landing ===
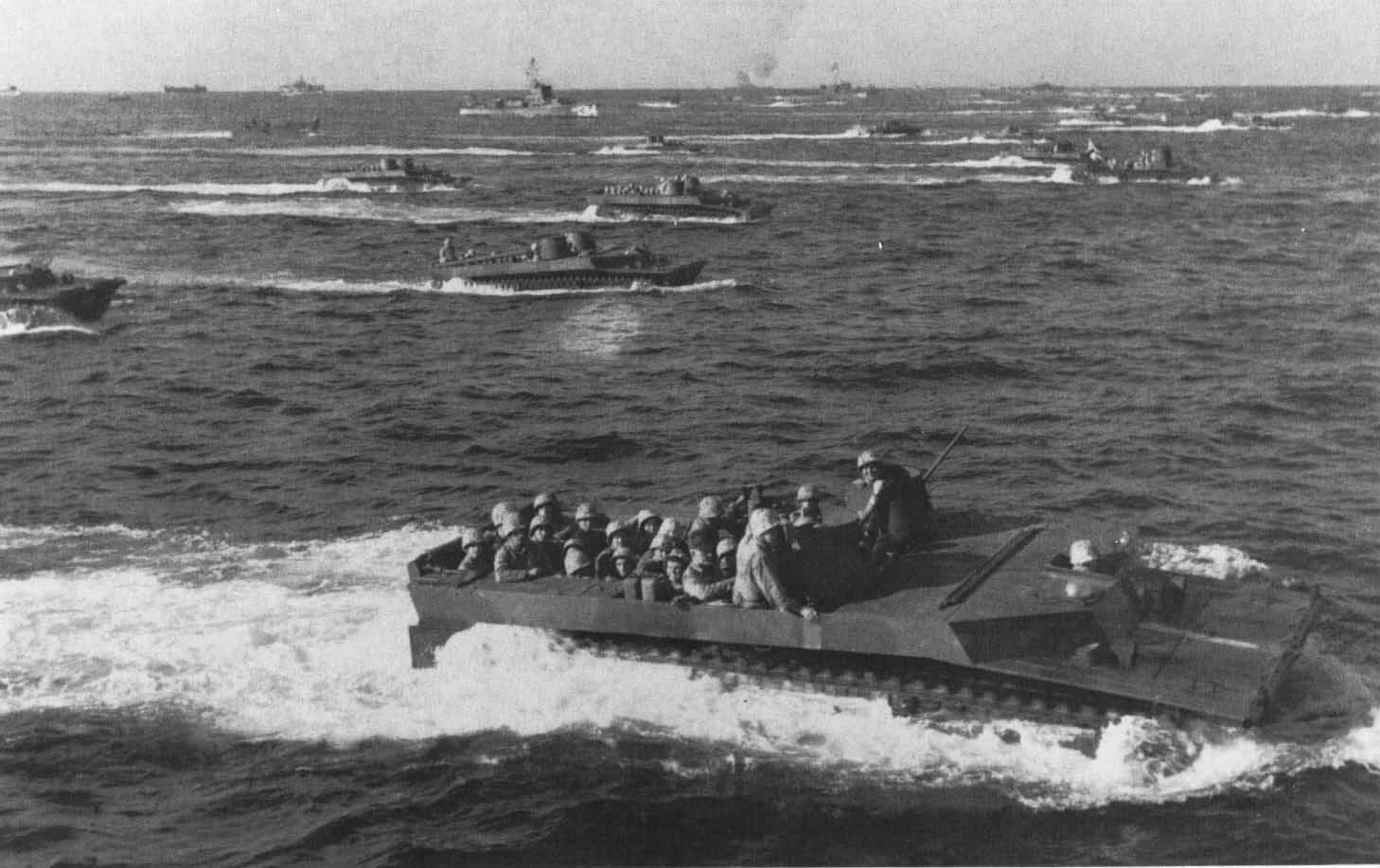
LVT-4s like these ferried French troops during Operation Camargue. Here, LVT-4s are pictured carrying American marines to the beaches of Iwo Jima.

On 27 July 1953, the French landing craft departed from their assembly points, and by 04:00 on the following had begun disembarking 160 amphibious landing craft belonging to Group A's 3rd Amphibious opposite the coastline. By 06:00, these vehicles had landed on the beach and proceeded to occupy sand ridges overlooking the dunes beyond. Proceeding into the dunes, the vehicles of 3rd Amphibious became stuck in the sand; in the meantime, other regular infantry elements of Group A were experiencing more difficulties in the sea, taking two extra hours to reach the beach. Thus unsupported, elements of 3rd Amphibious that either disembarked floundering vehicles or were pushed, managed to escape the dunes and advance between Tân An and Mỹ Thủy. The French amphibious vehicles were the World War II-era 29-C cargo carriers, nicknamed the "crab" or "crabe" and LVT 4 or 4As, known as "alligators". The latter were armed with two .30 caliber and two .50 caliber Browning machine guns and an M20 recoilless rifle. While the alligators were sufficiently armoured and well suited to the water, they struggled on land. In contrast, the crab had difficulty in water and its large size presented too great a target on land; however, it was lighter and more maneuverable, except in paddy fields where its suspension became clogged with vegetation.

While Group A's forward elements were breaching the dune barrier unopposed, two of Group B's battalions crossed the Van Trịnh Cănal. By 07:45, when they made visual contact with the crabs and alligators of Group A, they had succeeded in sealing off the northern escape route of Regiment 95. By 08:30, the 6th Moroccan Spahis also reached the canal, having had difficulty crossing the swamps on the landward side with their M24 Chaffee tanks. No French units, as yet, had made any major contact with the Viet Minh. A minor fire-fight had taken place on the southern edge of Group B's advance when an Algerian company exchanged fire with 20–30 Viet Minh and suffered the first French fatalities. Simultaneously, Group C had advanced into the center of the area of operation, and executed "the most complicated maneuver of the operation". This involved crossing Route One and sealing off the land side of the operational area, and was completed by 08:30.

Group D, finally, was tasked with advancing south from its landing point to close off an escape route that ran between the sea and an inland lagoon towards the city of Hué. Landing at 04:30, the group made quick progress through the beach and dunes, secured the small city of Thé Chi Dong and hit the north coast of the lagoon by 05:30, thereby sealing off that escape route with no enemy contact. The final act of sealing the noose was to move some of the French Navy vessels north to the Vietnamese villages of Ba-Lang and An-Hoi where any attempt by Regiment 95 to flee by sea would have taken place.

=== Tightening the loop ===
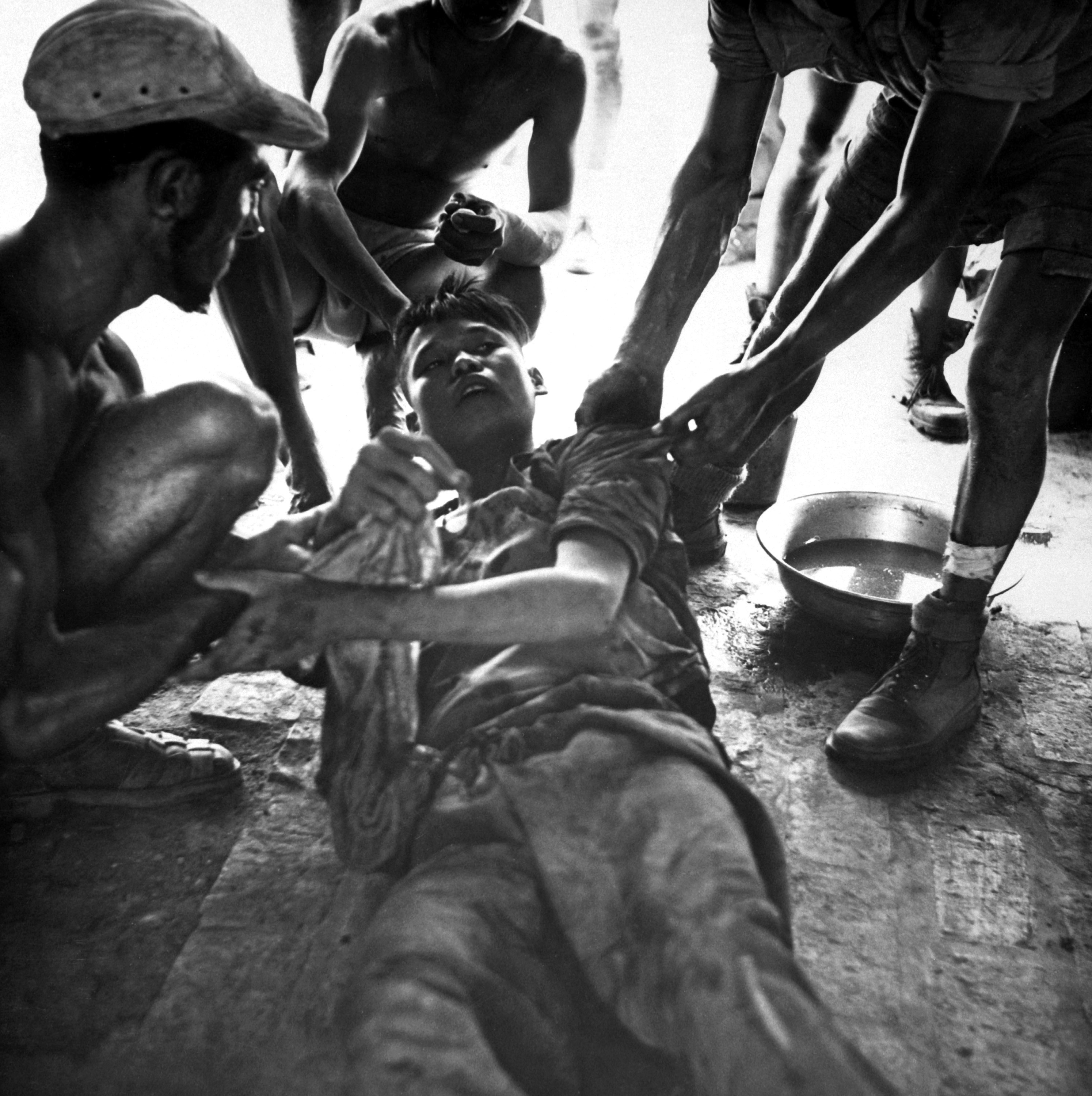
Pro-French Vietnamese soldiers, like these shown here treating a Viet Minh prisoner, formed part of the French landing forces in Operation Camargue.

With the landings and the encirclement of Regiment 95 complete and the net deemed secure, the French forces began the second phase of the operation and began to sweep through the area for the encircled Viet Minh. Each French group began to move through the villages around Route One in an attempt to locate the Viet Minh forces. Group B, which was lined up along the canal – the jump-off point for the second phase of the operation – moved to sweep the northern villages while Group C did the same further south. The method of searching each village was to seal it off entirely with encircling troops, and then inspect it with a heavily armed unit of minesweepers and K-9 teams. Men of military age were arrested and screened by intelligence officers. This process was time-consuming, and by 11:00 Group B had traveled 7 kilometers (4.3 mi) through the network of villages with no results or resistance. At this time, the 6th Moroccan Spahis entered the village of Dong-Qué with their M-24 tanks and the support of the 1st Battalion of the Moroccan Rifles and the artillery of Colonel Piroth (later commander of the artillery at the battle of Dien Bien Phu) and his 69th African Artillery Regiment.

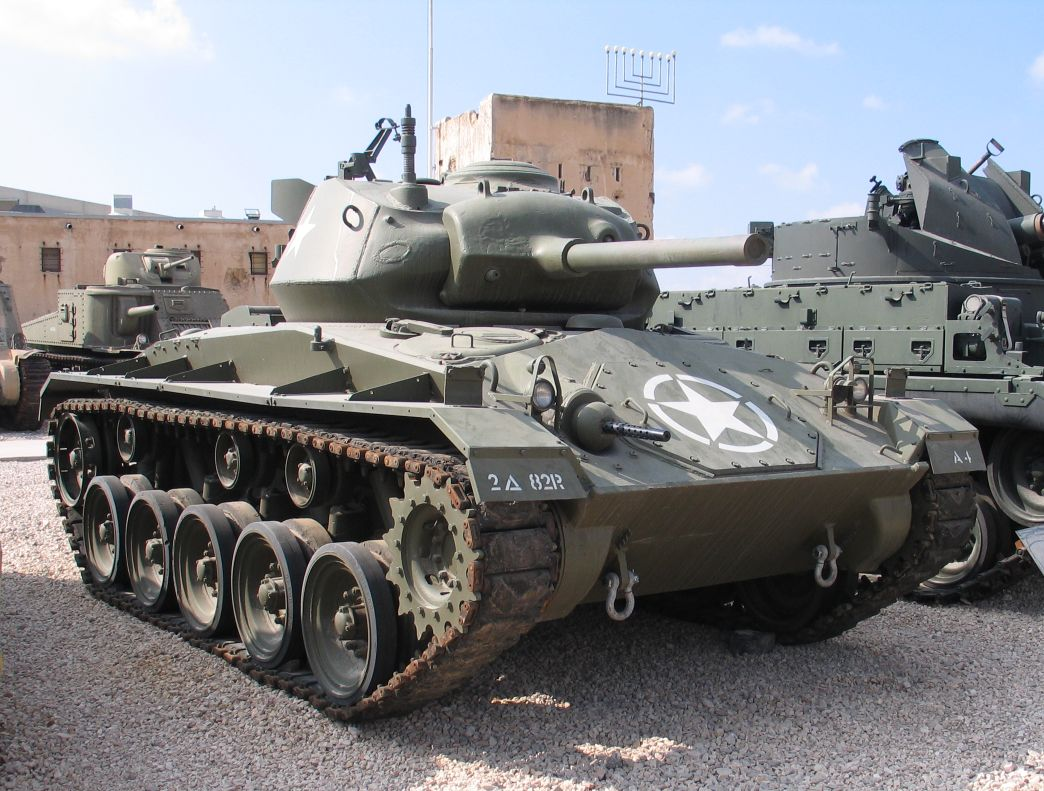
M24-Chaffee tanks accompanied the French in Operation Camargue. Though they have a top speed of 25 mph (40 km/h) off-road, the French found progress particularly slow in the boggy landscape inland of Route One.

The Moroccan infantry took the lead, and the French commanders sealed themselves in their tank turrets and advanced behind. Viet Minh forces, which were waiting in ambush, fired almost the same instant as the lead Moroccan units who noticed their presence. The Moroccan forces spread out into the surrounding rice paddies, and the bazookas of the Viet Minh missed the French tanks. The French commander called in Piroth's artillery and Dong-Qué "disintegrated under the impact of their high-angle fire", particularly when a French shell found the Viet Minh ammunition depot. As the French tanks approached, the Viet Minh drove the civilians out to clog up the entrance to the village, however as the Viet Minh retreated they were spotted through the civilians by the Moroccan infantry and killed by 13:00. During this battle, however, most of the Regiment 95 personnel who had been elsewhere managed to escape towards the southern end of the French encirclement. Leblanc had realized the intentions of Regiment 95's commander, and had requested one of the two reserve paratroop units to be deployed at the border between the network of temples and the dune-filled area in front of where Group D had originally landed. This paratroop unit, 2nd Battalion of the 1st Colonial Parachute Regiment, began to advance towards the canal at 10:45, 15 minutes before Group B entered Dong-Qué.

Group C's 9th Tabor had also, like the M-24s of Group B, struggled through the marshes during the first phase of the operation, and were late in arriving at the jumping-off point for phase two, the canal. At 08:45, Moroccan units of Group C were investigating the village of Phu An on the opposite side of the lagoon from Group D's landing area, when they came under heavy fire. Despite being nearer to Group D, the engaged units radioed their immediate commanders back in Group C, who were by now some distance away, further inland. This delay, coupled with the failure of many of the units' SCR300 radios, meant that these advance elements of Group C failed to get through until 09:10. At 09:40, the commander of Group C called up various reinforcements from Hué including two companies of Vietnamese trainee NCOs and five infantry companies, two of which came via landing craft and did not reach the beleaguered elements of Group C until 18:00, half an hour after the Moroccans had finally counter-attacked and occupied Phu-An. The 2nd Battalion of the Parachute Chasseurs Regiment had been requested to drop at 14:00 to support the advanced elements of Group C but did not jump until 16:50 and thus failed to assemble before the Moroccans themselves occupied Phu-An. With the final capture of Phu-An, the extreme southern tip of the encirclement, the pincer movement was complete.

=== Escape of Regiment 95 ===
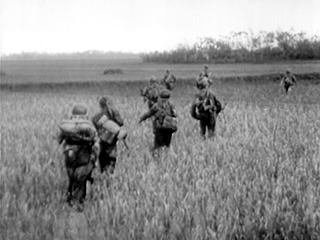
French troops sweeping paddy fields, similar to those through which Regiment 95 escaped

By 17:30, with Phu-An captured, all French reserves now committed, and one half of the pocket fully swept by groups B and A at the northern end of the battlefield, the French appeared to have gained the upper hand. By now, the expected windfall of arms caches and prisoners should have taken place. However, the unexpected time taken to capture Phu-An, and the delayed arrival of the paratroop reinforcements who had been scattered by the winds, had left a gap between Phu-An and the southern edge of the lagoon. This 12-kilometer (7.5 mi) gap was eventually covered by only four French battalions, leaving gaps through which the Viet Minh could escape. Crabs and alligators were stationed on, or in some cases in, the canal network, and French infantry were scattered across the edge of the pocket throughout that night in order to detect escaping Viet Minh. However, despite the occasional shot, flare and searchlight, no Viet Minh were detected.

On the morning of 29 July 1953, the French forces continued to advance into the remaining 23-square-kilometer (9 sq mi) pocket, encountering neither Viet Minh nor civilian. Groups A, B and D reached the edge of the canal opposite Group C by 13:00, having retrieved a small number of suspected Viet Minh and a "few weapons". At this time, however, a Morane aircraft detected the movement of elements of Regiment 95 towards An-Hoi on the extreme northern corner of the operational area, outside of the pocket. The French carried out a raid on An-Hoi by commando groups and elements of Group A, which took place at 15:00 and returned with suspected Viet Minh by 18:00. The French then undertook a methodical house-to-house search of the entire area, sweeping each village, and the surrounding paddy fields and jungle, risking encounter with Viet Minh caltrops. Meanwhile, 2nd and 3rd amphibious used their crabs and alligators to herd prisoners towards Trung-An for interrogation. By the end of 29 July, with resistance to the French forces having ceased, a general withdrawal of paratroopers, amphibious groups and marines began.

== Aftermath ==
=== Rebuilding and reaction ===
After the departure of all but regular French infantry, efforts to make the area suitable for permanent occupation by French forces and French-friendly civilians began. This involved the rebuilding of road and rail links (Vietnam's North–South railway ran alongside Route One), the repairing of infrastructure, demining, the installation of new Vietnamese government administrators, and the provision of "everything from rice to anti-malaria tablets". Over 24 villages were placed under the authority of the Vietnamese government, and Regiment 95 had been driven from the area. In comparison to Fall, South Vietnamese general Lâm Quang Thi states in his memoirs that Operation Camargue was "one of the most successful French military operations during the Indochina war" in the area of Route One.

...although the operation does not appear to have been successful in all its objectives, 600 Viet Minh soldiers were killed or wounded, and 900 others were captured. Important stocks of paddy were found, but the number of arms captured was not as great as expected; it is thought that: the Viet Minh soldiers, on finding themselves surrounded, threw their weapons into the rice fields and swamps.

— A French spokesperson, quoted in: "Viet Nam Hopes of Independence Coming Talks on Paris", The Times, Saturday 1 August 1953, page 5 column D. Issue: 52689.

Newspapers stated that the operation had been a "total success, demonstrating once more the new aggressiveness and mobility" of the French forces. However, in the days following the end of the fighting, press reports on the French failure to capture the anticipated large numbers of Viet Minh began to appear though the British newspaper, The Times, did publish claimed casualty figures of 1,550 for the Viet Minh, 200 of which were killed. This estimate was altered by the French the next day to 600 killed or wounded and 900 captured, and it was suggested that the operation did "not appear to have been successful". In contrast to these figures, Bernard Fall records 182 Viet Minh dead and 387 prisoners. He also notes that "51 rifles, eight sub-machine guns, two mortars, and five BARs" were captured. Of the prisoners, however, it is not recorded how many were confirmed to be members of Regiment 95. Both Fall and the newspapers published in the days following the official termination of the operation on 10 August 1953, give French casualties as 17 dead and 100 wounded. Giáp wrote "it was announced we suffered heavy losses although in fact our losses were insignificant ... their troops had to withdraw with heavy losses".

Fall goes on to record that the "major defect" of Operation Camargue was that the French had nothing like the numerical superiority to encircle a force in the terrain around Road One, 15:1 as opposed to the 20:1 or 25:1 that he believed required. He states that the slow French progress (around 1,500 yards an hour) and the large distances each unit had to guard from Viet Minh infiltration meant that the Viet Minh could easily escape the net. He also states that Viet Minh intelligence were always aware of French movements, as the size of French units and the complex technology involved in the operation gave its presence and intentions away almost immediately, whereas in contrast the simpler Viet Minh operations were far more difficult to detect.

=== Route One and Regiment 95 ===
Regiment 95 survived Operation Camargue and resumed ambushes in 1954, as well as assaulting a Vietnamese garrison near Hué. The regiment remained in the area, taking part in General Giáp's 1954 campaign season, until Vietnam was split into North and South Vietnam by the cease-fire, whereupon it infiltrated back to the north along Route One during broad daylight, leaving small cells of guerillas in the area. The regiment returned to resume ambushes of the South Vietnamese Army in 1962.
