= Byron G. Highland =

American photographer (1934–1967)

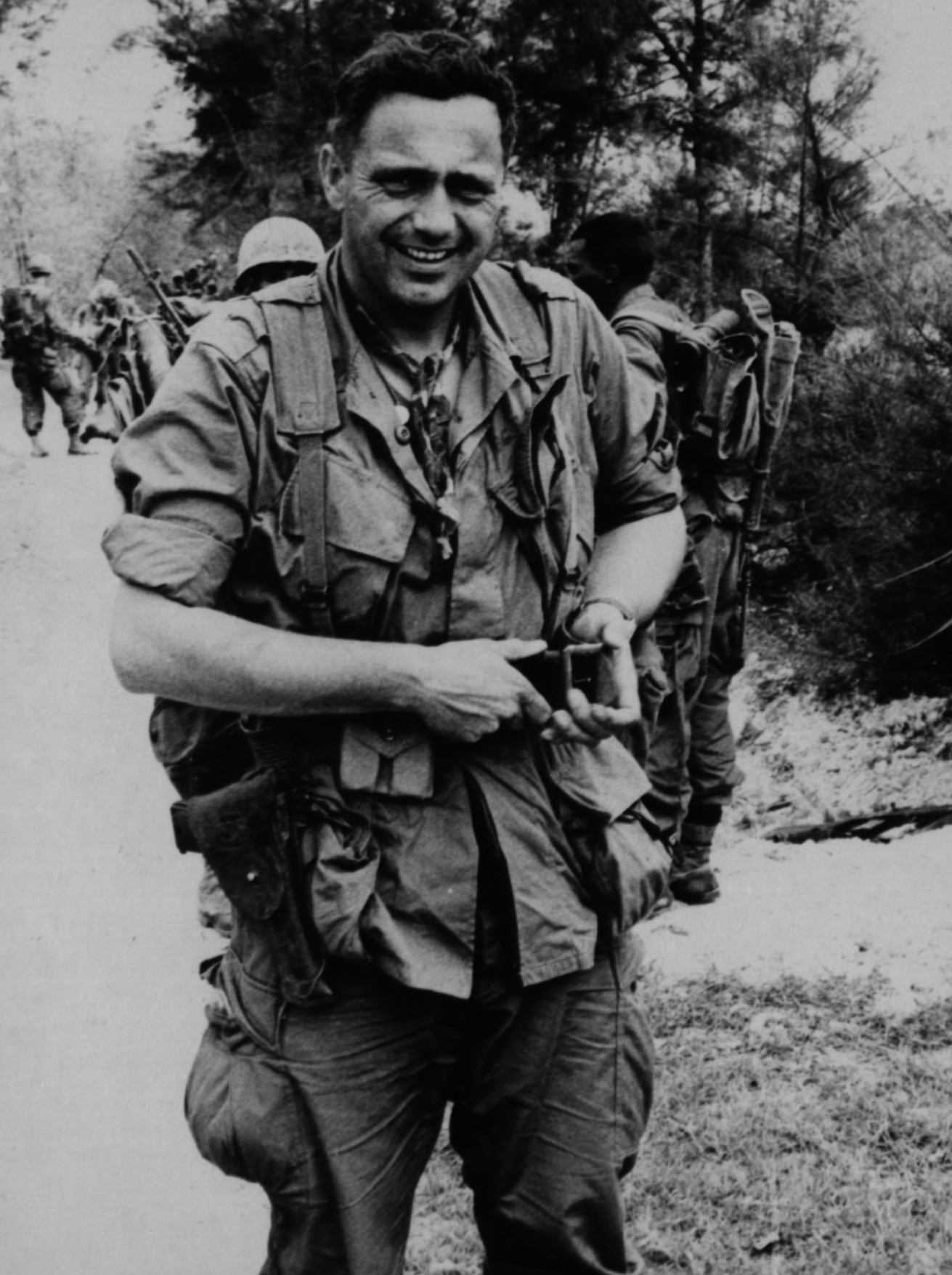
- Byron G. Highland during Operation Chinook II
- Born: February 18, 1934; Detroit, Michigan, U.S.
- Died: February 21, 1967 (aged 33); Street Without Joy, Thừa Thiên Province, South Vietnam
- Military career
- Allegiance: United States
- Branch: United States Marine Corps
- Service years: 1953–1967
- Rank: Gunnery sergeant
- Conflicts: Korean War; Vietnam War †

Byron G. Highland (February 8, 1934 – February 21, 1967) was a United States Marine Corps combat photographer during the Vietnam War who was killed by a landmine alongside the war correspondent and historian Bernard B. Fall while observing Operation Chinook II on the Street Without Joy, Thừa Thiên Province on 21 February 1967, leaving behind his wife, and two sons and a daughter from a previous marriage.

The last few minutes which the two spent together are documented in Fall's posthumously published book Last Reflections on a War, via a tape recorder Fall was dictating into just prior to the explosion.

Born in Detroit, he entered the Marines in 1953, and also served in the Korean War.

His eldest son, Kenneth E. Highland, later recorded a song with the punk band Johnny and the Jumper Cables, entitled "Landmine", about his father's death.

== See also ==
- List of journalists killed and missing in the Vietnam War
