= U Minh Thượng National Park =

National park in Vietnam

- IUCN category II (national park)
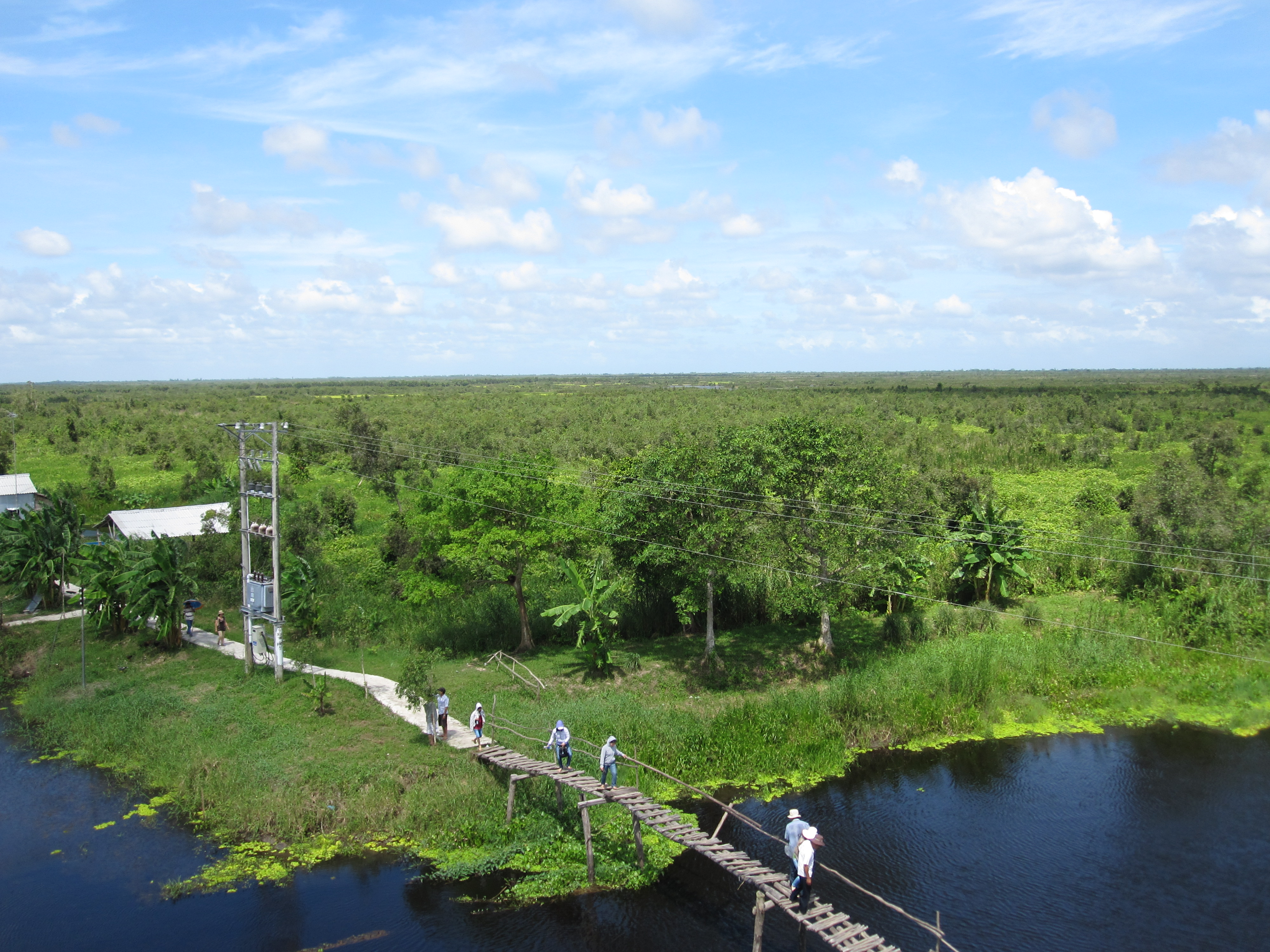
- U Minh Thượng National Park

- Location within Vietnam
- Location: Mekong Delta, Vietnam
- Nearest city: Cần Thơ
- Coordinates: 9°35′00″N 105°5′0″E
- Area: 80.53 km^{2} (30 square miles)
- Established: 14 January 2002
- Governing body: UBND of An Giang Province

Ramsar Wetland
- Official name: U Minh Thuong National Park
- Designated: 30 April 2015
- Reference no.: 2228

U Minh Thượng National Park or National Park of Upper U Minh (Vietnamese language: Vườn quốc gia U Minh Thượng) is a national park in the province of An Giang, Vietnam.

== Establishment ==
It was established according to decision number 11/2002/QĐ-TTg, dated 14 January 2002, signed by then Vietnamese Prime Minister Nguyễn Tấn Dũng. This decision turned the U Minh Thuong Nature Reserve into U Minh Thuong National Park.

== Area and location ==
The park covers approximately 80.53 km^{2} (30 square miles) with the nearest city being Cần Thơ

== Flora and fauna ==
U Minh Thuong National Park is widely considered the richest region of the Mekong Delta in terms of plant and animal biodiversity. It boasts of over 243 plant species. The park has a rich and varied mammalian population, totaling an impressive 32 species, including hairy-nosed otters. U Minh Thuong National Park is a haven for rare and endangered birds. A total of 187 species of birds has been recorded here, including the oriental darter, spot-billed pelican, black-headed ibis, glossy ibis, greater spotted eagle and Asian golden weaver. There are also a total of 39 amphibian species and 34 species of fish in the park. Both the saltwater crocodile and the Siamese crocodile were once found here, but a 2002 study concluded that both species were extinct in the park.

== History ==
During the First Indochina War, the U Minh Forest was a Viet Minh stronghold. During the Vietnam War, it was a Vietcong base area. Officers Humbert Roque Versace and James N. Rowe of the United States Army were captured by the Vietcong during a battle in the U Minh Forest in October 1963.

== French paratrooper myth ==
There is an old myth circulated among veterans and military personnel that in 1952, 500 French paratroopers were dropped over the U Ming forest and vanished without a trace. The French did have a parachutist unit, the 1st Vietnamese Parachute Battalion, however in the book Histoire des Parachutistes Français by Paul Gaujac, and in its follow-up book, De la guerre d'Indochine au Temps de Paix, there is no record of any 500-man jump over the forest, nor is there any record of the unit operating in the area in 1952. This story is likely to have been fabricated in the early 1960s.
