= Street Without Joy (book) =

1961 book

Street Without Joy; Indochina At War, 1946-54
- Title page for Street Without Joy (1961)
- Author: Bernard B. Fall
- Language: English
- Publisher: Stackpole Books
- Publication date: 1961
- Media type: Print; hardcover
- Pages: 322
- OCLC: 1020224769
- Dewey Decimal: 959.7 FAL

Street without Joy is a 1961 book about the First Indochina War (1946–1954); it was revised in 1964. The author Bernard B. Fall was a French-American professor and journalist. He had been on-site as a French soldier, and then as an American war correspondent. The book gives a first-hand look at the French engagement, with an insider understanding of Vietnamese events, and provided insights into guerrilla warfare. It drew wide interest among Americans in the mid-1960s, when their own country markedly increased its activity in the Vietnam War.

The title of the book was taken from the name given by French soldiers to a stretch of Route 1 which had been fortified by their enemies, the Viet Minh. It ran along the central coast of Vietnam from Huế north to Quảng Trị. In French it was called La Rue Sans Joie.

== The book ==
Fall's book Street without Joy is a "sketch" or essay on the military-political history of the war largely fought between the French Army, who sought to reclaim Vietnam, and the Viet Minh, a force organized by Vietnamese communists, who resisted. Earlier during World War II, the Japanese Army had in September 1940 attacked and conquered French Indochina. Following Japan's defeat in the Asia-Pacific War and withdrawal of its forces, this new war began. It ended in 1954 with the Geneva accords, whereby France withdrew from north Vietnam, the Viet Minh from south Vietnam. For the time being, an independent Vietnam was divided into two states, North and South.

Street without Joy does not pretend to provide a comprehensive account of the First Indochinese War. It focuses almost entirely on the period after 1950 when Chinese and American intervention had both enlarged and internationalized the conflict. It is episodic, singling out for special attention a series of major French operations..., [including] Operation Camargue, a 1953 effort to clean up the Vietminh-infested area known by French soldiers as the 'street without joy'."

The book was widely praised for its insider depiction of Vietnam, its people and culture. Especially, it recounted how the French forces were unable to adequately comprehend the 'people's war' their Vietnamese foes were fighting. Frances FitzGerald, the journalist and author of Fire in the Lake (1972), describes Street without Joy as, "[H]is major work on the French war [where] he argued that the nature of the conflict was political rather than simply military and described the trials of the French soldiers in vivid, human terms. Praise for the book appeared in US military journals."

Fitzgerald recalled that "the [American] commanding general at Fort Bragg, who was training the elite Special Forces for counterinsurgency warfare in Vietnam, often invited its author to lecture." Four decades later, she writes, Fall's book "reappeared on the reading list for officers during the Iraq War." During the Vietnam war, "Many an American officer got his first real appreciation of the agony of Vietnam by reading Dr. Fall's Street Without Joy .... Dr. Fall's material was mostly gathered first hand in 1953-54 when he lived in Hanoi and accompanied French forces on combat operations."

== Editions ==
- Fall, Bernard B. (1994). Street Without Joy (1994: illustrated; revised; reprint ed.). Mechanicsburg PA: Stackpole Books. ISBN 0-8117-1700-3.

Street without Joy. Indochina at war, 1946-54 was written in English by professor-journalist Bernard Fall. It was published in 1961 by Stackpole Co. in Harrisurg, PA. A revised text was issued in 1964 with an 'Author's Preface' of same date, and an added chapter, "The Second Indochina War". A reprint was published in 1972 by Schocken, New York.

Subsequently, in 1994 Stackpole Books reissued it, evidently in the revised text, with a new 1993 Introduction by prof. George C. Herring, and an undated Foreword by Marshall Andrews (apparently from the first edition). Included are about thirty battlefield maps by the author, and numerous French Army and Viet Minh photographs. The art work is by Dorothy Fall (the author's wife).

The 1994 Table of Contents:

Introduction, Foreword, Author's Preface,

1. How War Came, 2. Set-Piece Battle I, 3. Set-Piece Battle II,

4. Diary: Milk Run, 5. Laos Outpost, 6. Diary: The Women,

7. "Street without Joy", 8. Diary: Inspection Tour,

9. End of a Task Force, 10. Diary: The Men, 11. Death March,

12. Why Dien Bien Phu? 13. The Loss Of Laos,

14. The Second Indochina War, 15. The Future of Revolutionary War.

Appendices: I, II, III, and IV.

About the four chapters indicating the employment of a Diary, Fall here described his personal experiences of the war which animate his book. He was not a journalist, but a scholar doing research. Yet, as a "Frenchman who had formerly served" he was permitted to accompany the French army and live "with the men who were doing the fighting". He "met many a soldier, French or Asian, who could tell me in his own terms what it was like to be out along the defense perimeter, wet and afraid." He writes that it "knocked the intellectual superciliousness out of me." What experiences Fall could "not use for my research went into a diary in the form of letters to the American girl who is now my wife." Fall adds, "I feel that it has a place" in the book.

== Bernard Fall in Vietnam ==
During World War II, Fall served in the French resistance and later in the French Army. Also a reserve officer, he became familiar with the French military from the inside. In 1953 he went to Vietnam, where he did research for his doctoral dissertation on the revolutionary insurgents. It was published as The Vietminh Regime (1956). He wrote hundreds of articles and seven books, including Communist subversion in the SEATO area (1960), Le Viet Minh 1945-1960 (1960), The Two Vietnams. A political and military analysis (1963), Hell in a Very Small Place. The siege of Dien Bien Phu (1966), Vietnam Witness (1966), in addition to his 1961 Street without Joy. As a journalist he wrote pieces about Vietnam, e.g., for The Nation, The New Republic, Ramparts, The New York Times, The Washington Post.

In the late 1950s he taught for a U.S. government program in Indochina, and did fieldwork in South Vietnam for the administration reform sought by the Diem regime. He later fell out with both the USG and Diem. He'd become a professor at Howard University in Washington, and an informed critic, a recognized scholar, and an expert on Vietnam. He spoke critically of the war. Yet "endorsements from military men often made anti-war activists uncomfortable."

Fall was killed in 1967.

The Vietnam War (1955-1975), also called the Second Indochina War, had escalated. "After the American regular forces entered the war, Fall went to South Vietnam every year, often going out on operations with American troops."

The geographic area called 'Street Without Joy' again became a stronghold and base area, this time for the Viet Cong, successors to the Viet Minh. There, "about 14 miles northwest of Huế" the author himself, recorder of many Vietnam tragedies, was killed by a land mine on 21 February 1967, "along a desolate stretch of seacoast known as the Street Without Joy."
