= 5th Vietnamese Parachute Battalion =

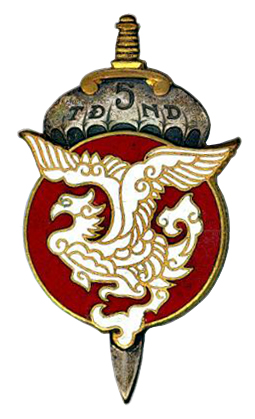
- Active: 1953-75
- Country: State of Vietnam; Republic of Vietnam
- Branch: Vietnamese National Army
- Type: Airborne force
- Size: Battalion
- Part of: Groupe d'Opération Nord-Ouest (GONO)
- Nickname: 5e Bawouan

The 5th Vietnamese Parachute Battalion (Fr: 5e bataillon de parachutistes vietnamiens) was one of the Vietnamese National Army (VNA)'s airborne forces under the command of the Operational Group North-West (GONO), French Far East Expeditionary Corps during the First Indochina War. The bataillon was formed in Hanoi on 1 September 1953 and was a paratrooper battalion of the State of Vietnam, an independent country within the French Union. Later it became a part of the Republic of Vietnam Military Forces when the State of Vietnam became a republic in 1955.

== Operational history ==
The 5th Vietnamese Parachute Battalion (5 BPVN) was one of five battalions of Vietnamese paratroopers raised by the French Army between 1951 and 1954 as part of General Jean de Lattre de Tassigny's policy to establish a Vietnamese Army. It was formed on September 1, 1953 from the transfer of the PC and the 3rd and 23rd Indochinese parachute companies of the French 3rd Colonial Parachute Battalion, dissolved the day before and repatriated to France.

The battalion participated in Operation Pike (September - October 1953), Operation Castor (November 1953) and the Battle of Dien Bien Phu.

== Commanding officers ==
- Capitaine Jacques Bouvery (September 1953 - December 1953)
- Commandant André Botella (December 1953 - May 1954)
- Capitaine Tholly (June 1954 - July 1954)
- Capitaine Lesaux (July 1954)

== Sources ==
- Hell In A Very Small Place - Bernard Fall (1966)

== See also ==
- 1st Cambodian Parachute Regiment
- 1st Laotian Parachute Battalion
