= 7th Vietnamese Parachute Battalion =

French-Vietnamese paratroop battalion

The 7th Vietnamese Parachute Battalion (Fr: 7e bataillon de parachutistes vietnamiens) was a French-Vietnamese paratroop battalion formed in Hanoi, French Indochina in 1953.

It was part of the First Indochina War.
