= Street Without Joy =

Area of Vietnam in the First Indochina War

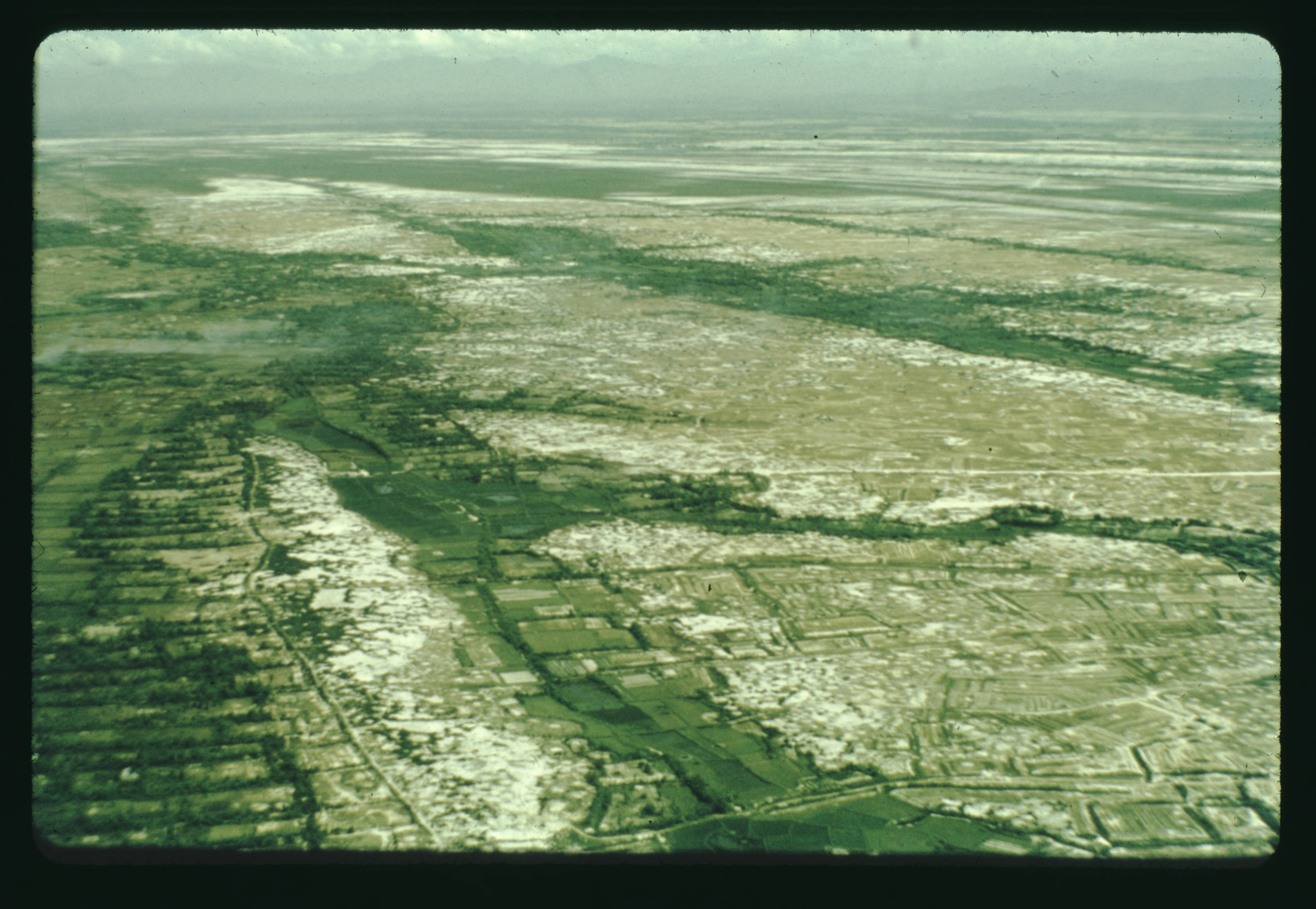
Street without Joy, 15 July 1968

Street Without Joy or La Rue Sans Joie was the name given by troops of the French Far East Expeditionary Corps to the stretch of Route 1 from Huế to Quảng Trị during the First Indochina War.

== Situation ==
The Viet Minh had fortified a string of villages along a line of sand dunes and salt marshes between Route 1 and the South China Sea and used these bases to launch ambushes on convoys passing on Route 1 and on the adjacent Hanoi-Saigon railway line which together formed the principal lines of communication between northern and southern Vietnam.

French colonial forces carried out a major attack on the Street Without Joy in Operation Camargue in July–August 1953.

== The book ==
The area was made known to an English-speaking audience in the book Street Without Joy by Bernard B. Fall, first published in 1961. He described the terrain encountered by the French in Operation Camargue as follows:

From the coast looking inland, the zone of operations divided itself into seven distinct natural strips of land. The first was the coastline itself, fairly straight, covered with hard sand and offering no particular difficulties. However, a bare 100 meters beyond began the dunes, varying in height from 15 to 60 feet, very hard to climb and ending on the land side in veritable ditches or precipices. A few fishing villages are precariously perched in the dune zone, which in certain places has a depth of more than two kilometers. Then comes a zone of about 800 meters deep entirely covered with small pagodas or tombs and temples, which offer excellent protection to any defenders. This zone is followed by the "Street Without Joy" itself, fringed by a rather curious system of interlocking villages separated one from the other by often less than 200 to 300 yards. Each village forms a veritable little labyrinth that measures barely more than 200 feet by 300 feet and is surrounded by bushes, hedges or bamboo trees, and small fences which made ground as well as aerial surveillance almost impossible. [The Viet Minh] had spent more than two years fortifying the villages with an interlocking system of trenches and tunnels, underground arms depots, and first-aid stations... Close to 20 miles long and more than 300 yards wide, this zone of villages constituted the heart of the Communist resistance zone along the central Annam coast.

== Surroundings ==
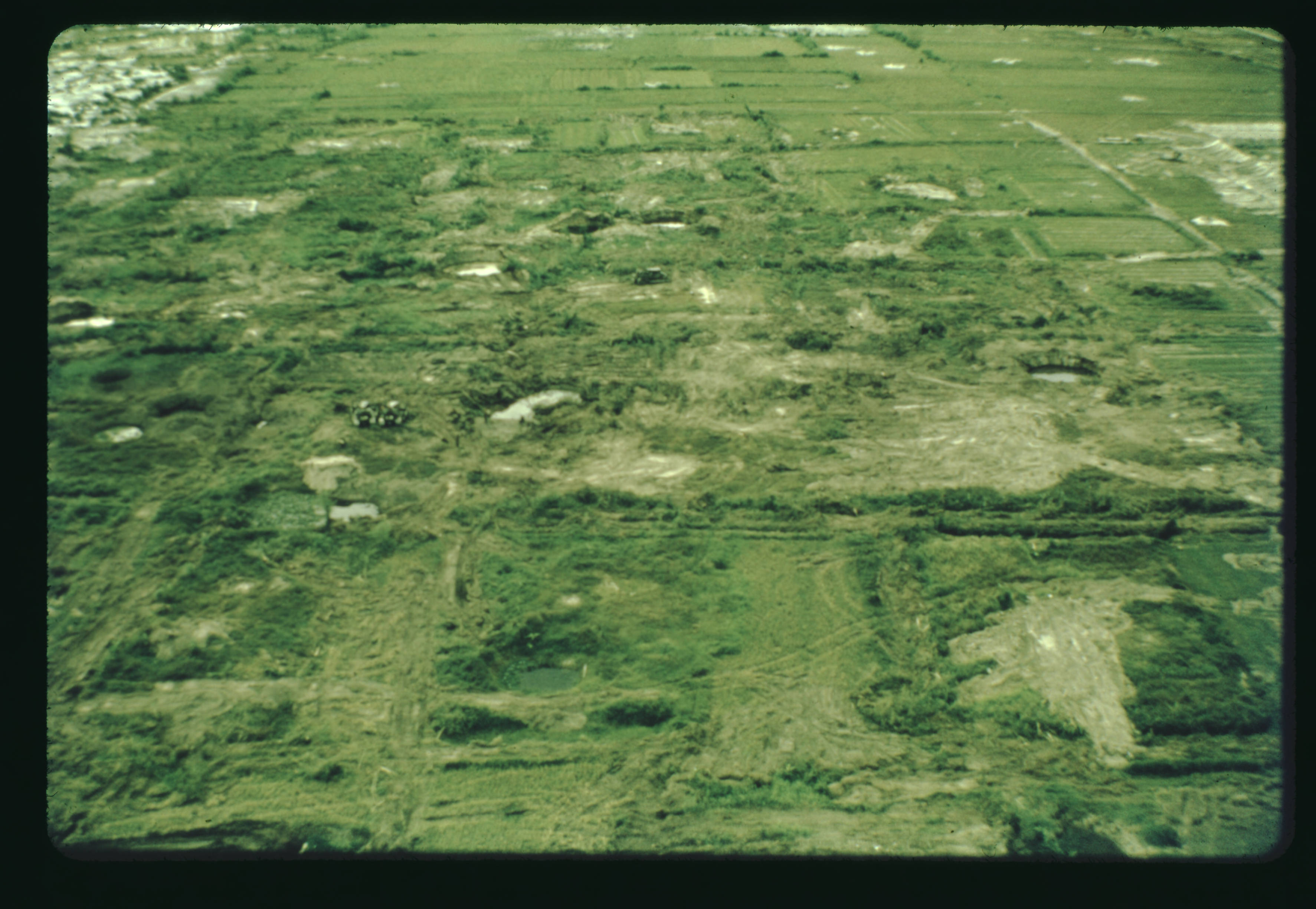
The 1st Cavalry Division supported by the 14th Engineer Battalion is conducting Operation Open Housing to eliminate VC sanctuaries, 15 July 1968

On the land side, the "Street Without Joy" was preceded by another, less well-defined line of villages, the centre of which was Van Trinh. This was protected in turn by a vast zone of swamps, sand holes and quicksand bogs, extending all the way to Route 1. With an average width of about eight kilometers, it constitutes an almost impassable barrier to tanks and other motorized vehicles of the French Army, except on the few roads crossing it, which were, of course, heavily mined and sabotaged."

During the Vietnam War, the Street Without Joy again became a stronghold and base area for the Vietcong.

== Deaths ==
In February 1967, the 9th Marine Regiment was conducting Operation Chinook II on the Street Without Joy. Bernard Fall was observing the operation when he was killed by a mine explosion.

During the First Battle of Quảng Trị in the Easter Offensive of 1972, People's Army of Vietnam forces fired indiscriminately on the intermingled South Vietnamese military and refugee columns fleeing south from Quảng Trị killing approximately 2,000 civilians in the Shelling of Highway 1.
