= Bernard B. Fall =

American war correspondent

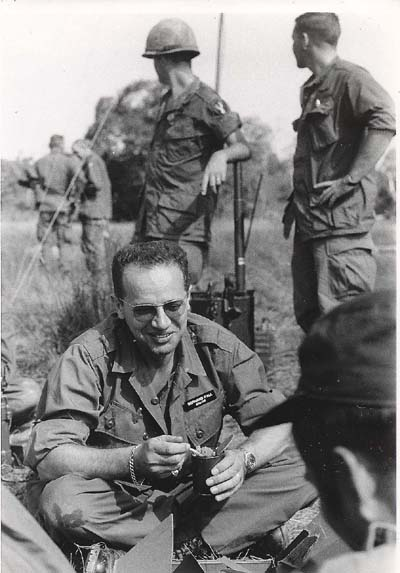
- Fall eating with US Army troops in Vietnam
- Born: November 19, 1926; Vienna, Austria
- Died: February 21, 1967 (aged 40); Street Without Joy, South Vietnam
- Education: University of Paris; Ludwig-Maximilians-Universität München; Syracuse University (MA; PhD)
- Occupations: War correspondent and historian
- Years active: 1953–1967
- Spouse: Dorothy Winer Fall
- Children: 3 daughters

Bernard B. Fall (November 19, 1926 – February 21, 1967) was a war correspondent, political scientist, and historian whose reporting focused on Indochina during the 1950s and 1960s. Born in Austria, he moved with his family to France as a child after the Anschluss. He started fighting for the French Resistance at the age of 16 and later for the French Army during World War II.

In 1951, he first came to the United States for graduate studies at Syracuse University, returning and making his residence there. He taught at Howard University for most of his career and made regular trips to Southeast Asia to learn about changes and their societies. He predicted the failures of France and the United States in their wars in Vietnam because of their tactics and lack of understanding of the societies. He was killed by a landmine in South Vietnam while he was accompanying US Marines on a patrol in 1967.

== Early life ==
Bernard Fall was born in Vienna, Austria, to Jewish parents Leo Fall and Anna Seligman. His family migrated in 1938, when he was 12, to live in France after the Anschluss, the annexation of Austria by Nazi Germany. After France fell to Germany in 1940, his father aided the French Resistance and was captured, tortured, and killed by the Gestapo. His mother was also captured and deported and was never heard from again.

In 1942, at the age of 16, Bernard Fall followed in his father's footsteps and joined the French Resistance after which he fought the Germans in the Alps. Fall enrolled at the Lycée Jules Ferry in Cannes where he completed his secondary education. As France was being liberated in 1944, Fall joined the French Army in which he served until 1946. For his service, he was awarded the French Liberation Medal. After World War II, Fall worked as an analyst for the Nuremberg War Crimes Tribunal in which capacity he investigated Krupp Industries.

== Academic career ==
Fall briefly studied at the University of Paris from 1948 to 1949 and, whilst a Search Officer for the United Nations, at the Ludwig-Maximilians-Universität München between 1949 and 1950. Moreover, he completed college courses in International Law and American Foreign Relations at the University of Maryland which recently had opened centres of education for American personnel stationed in Germany.

In 1951, Fall travelled to the United States on a Fulbright Scholarship to study at Syracuse University, where he received an MA in political science in 1952 and a PhD in 1955. In the summer of 1952, Fall took a course on Southeast Asia at the Johns Hopkins School of Advanced International Studies. The professor, Amry Vandenbosch, encouraged Fall to study Indochina because of his French background.

Not content to study Indochina from afar, Fall spent much of the year 1953 in Vietnam doing research for his Ph.D. dissertation. The Viet Minh were fighting the French Union forces there in the First Indochina War. His French citizenship allowed Fall to accompany French soldiers and pilots into enemy territory. From his observations, Fall predicted that the French would fail in Vietnam. When the French were defeated at the critical Battle of Dien Bien Phu, Fall claimed that the United States had been partly responsible for France's loss. Fall believed that the Americans had not sufficiently supported France during the war.

In 1954, Fall returned to the United States and married Dorothy Winer, a 1952 graduate of Syracuse University, and submitted his dissertation, Political Development of Viet-Nam, VJ-day to the Geneva Cease-Fire. In 1955, he became an assistant professor at American University in Washington, DC.

In 1956, he began teaching international relations courses at Howard University, also in Washington, DC. Fall became a full professor at Howard in 1962 and taught there intermittently until his death.

Never losing his interest in Indochina, Fall returned to the region five more times (in 1957, 1962, 1965, 1966, and 1967) to study developments firsthand. Fall was given a grant by the Southeast Asia Treaty Organization to study the development of communism in Southeast Asia. He documented the rise of communist activity in Laos. Fall was particularly interested in the tensions between North Vietnam and South Vietnam. While teaching at the Royal Institute of Administration in Cambodia in 1962, Fall was invited to interview Ho Chi Minh and Phạm Văn Đồng in Hanoi. Ho Chi Minh told Fall of his belief that communism would prevail in South Vietnam in about a decade's time.

Fall was a political scientist but had been a soldier and so spoke the soldier's language and shared soldiers' lives at the frontline. He obtained his data on the war while he slogged through the mud of Vietnam with French colonial troops, American infantrymen, and ARVN soldiers. He combined academic analysis of Indochina with a grunt's perspective of the war.

== Vietnam War ==
Fall supported the American military presence in South Vietnam, believing it could stop the country from falling to communism, but he strongly criticized Ngo Dinh Diem's American-backed regime and the tactics used by the United States military in Vietnam. As the conflict between the American forces and the communists in Vietnam escalated throughout the 1960s, Fall became increasingly pessimistic about the Americans' chances of success. He predicted that if it did not learn from France's mistakes, it too would fail in Vietnam. Fall wrote extensive articles detailing his analysis of the situation in Vietnam and lectured a great deal about his ideas on the Vietnam War. Fall's research was considered invaluable by many American diplomats and military officials, but his negative opinions were often not taken seriously. By 1964, Fall concluded that the American forces in Vietnam were losing. Fall's dire predictions caught the attention of the Federal Bureau of Investigation (FBI), which began to monitor his activities.

Many have noted Fall's accuracy and comprehension in his writing about the Vietnam War. In Colin Powell's 1995 autobiography, My American Journey, he wrote:

I recently reread Bernard Fall's book on Vietnam, Street Without Joy. Fall makes painfully clear that we had almost no understanding of what we had gotten ourselves into. I cannot help thinking that if President Kennedy or President Johnson had spent a quiet weekend at Camp David reading that perceptive book, they would have returned to the White House Monday morning and immediately started to figure out a way to extricate ourselves from the quicksand of Vietnam.

Noam Chomsky has called Fall "the most respected analyst and commentator on the Vietnam War."

== Death ==
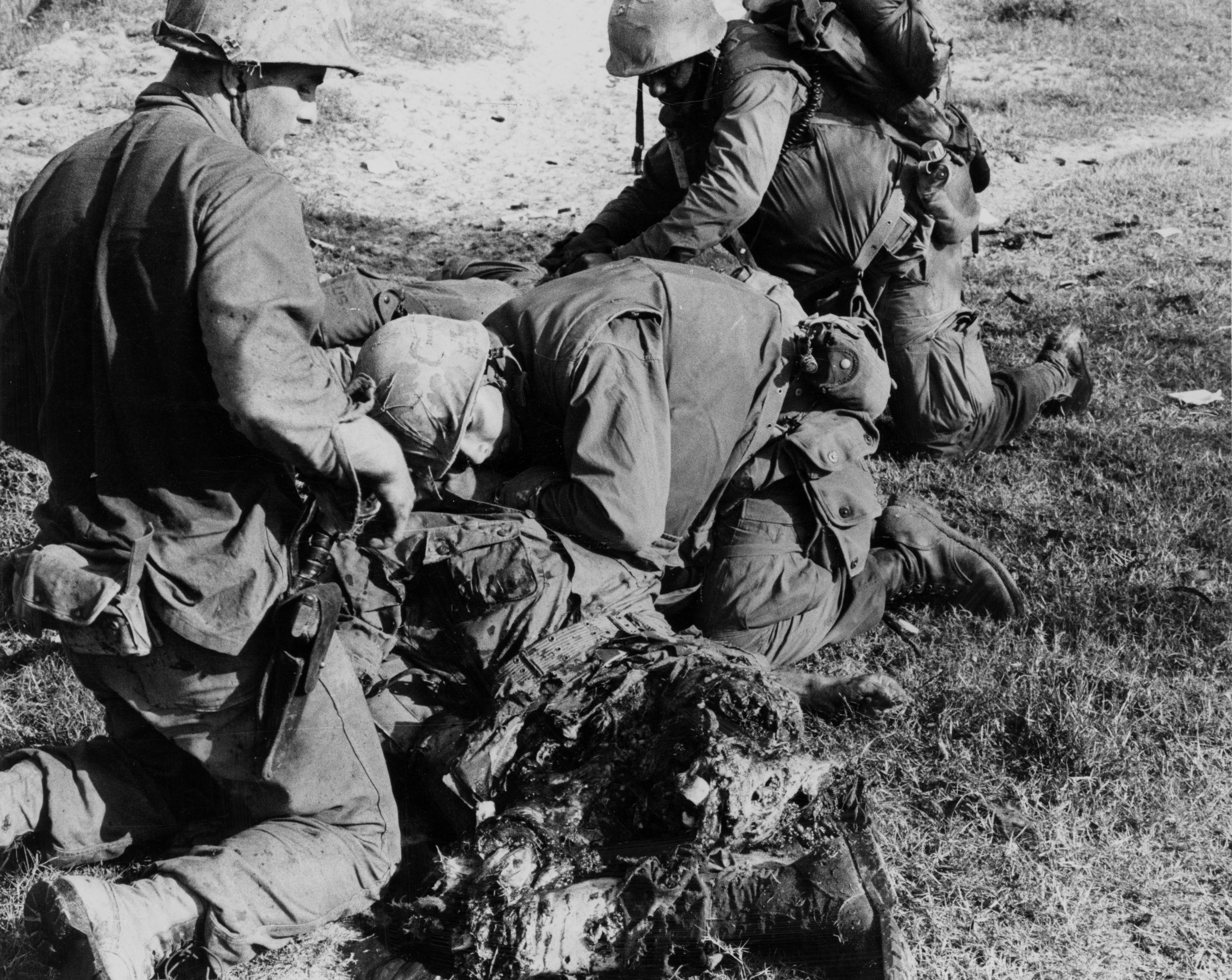
Corpsmen attempt to treat Bernard Fall and Byron Highland after mine explosion

Towards the end of his life, Fall suffered from retroperitoneal fibrosis, which resulted in the loss of a kidney and a colon blockage. According to his wife, his condition engendered a sense of fatalism as he departed for what turned out to be his final trip to Vietnam. On 21 February 1967, while accompanying a company of the 1st Battalion 9th Marines on Operation Chinook II in the Street Without Joy, Thừa Thiên Province, Fall stepped on a Bouncing Betty landmine, which killed both him and Gunnery Sergeant Byron G. Highland, a US Marine Corps combat photographer. He was dictating notes into a tape recorder, which captured his last words: "We've reached one of our phase lines after the firefight and it smells bad—meaning it's a little bit suspicious... Could be an amb—." Fall was survived by his wife and three daughters.

== Legacy and honors ==
The medical library at the main civilian hospital in Da Nang was named The Bernard B. Fall Memorial Medical Library in his honor.

- French Liberation Medal (1945)
- Fulbright Scholar (1950)
- United States Department of Defense Certificate of Appreciation (1961)
- George Polk Award in Journalism (1966)
- Guggenheim Fellowship for further research in Vietnam (1966)

== Books by Bernard Fall ==
- Anatomy of a Crisis: The Laotian Crisis of 1960–1961. Garden City, New York: Doubleday. 1969. OCLC 1686.
- Last Reflections on a War. Garden City, New York: Doubleday & Company. 1967. OCLC 1225688.
- Hell in a Very Small Place: The Siege of Dien Bien Phu. Lippincott. 1966. OCLC 2571399.
- The Two Vietnams: A Political and Military Analysis. 1963. OCLC 411218.
- Viet-Nam Witness, 1953–66 (1966)
- Street without Joy: Indochina at War, 1946–54. Harrisburg, Pa.: Stackpole. 1961. OCLC 00951887.
- The Viet-Minh Regime (1954)
- Le Viet Minh 1945–1960. Paris: Armand Colin. 1960.
- Ho Chi Minh on Revolution; Selected Writings 1920–66. Editor. Praeger, 1967.

== Books about Bernard Fall ==
- Fall, Dorothy (2006). Bernard Fall : memories of a soldier-scholar. Washington, D.C.: Potomac Books. ISBN 1574889575. OCLC 64442861.

== Research on Bernard Fall ==
- Innes, Michael A.K.G. (2020). Streets Without Joy: A Political History of Sanctuary and War. London: C. Hurst & Co. Publishers. ISBN 978-1787383173. OCLC 1121145163.
- Moir, Nathaniel L. (2017). "Bernard Fall and Vietnamese Revolutionary Warfare in Indochina". Small Wars & Insurgencies. 28 (6): 909–946. doi:10.1080/09592318.2017.1374594. ISSN 0959-2318. S2CID 149192578.
- Moir, Nathaniel L. (2022). Number One Realist: Bernard Fall and Vietnamese Revolutionary Warfare. Oxford University Press.

== See also ==
- List of journalists killed and missing in the Vietnam War
- Autrefois, Maison Privée
