= 1st Cambodian Parachute Regiment =

The 1st Cambodian Parachute Battalion (Fr: 1er bataillon de parachutistes khmers) was a French paratrooper battalion in French Indochina made up of Cambodian recruits during the colonial First Indochina War.

It was formed on December 1, 1952.
