= 3rd Vietnamese Parachute Battalion =

The 3rd Vietnamese Parachute Battalion (Fr: 3e bataillon de parachutistes vietnamiens, 3 BPVN) was a French-Vietnamese paratroop battalion formed in Hanoi, French Indochina in 1952.

== Operational history ==
The battalion was one of five battalions of Vietnamese paratroopers raised by the French Army between 1951 and 1957 as part of General Jean de Lattre de Tassigny's policy to establish a Vietnamese Army. The cadre for the battalion came from the 10th Colonial Parachute Battalion (10 BCCP).

The battalion participated in Operation Mimosa (May 1953), Operation Camargue (July 1953), Operation Concarneau (August 1953), Operation Lamballe (August 1953), Operation Mont St Michel (August 1953), Operation Flandre (September 1953) and Operation Eglantine (June 1954).

== Commanding officers ==
- Chef de bataillon Monteil (September 1952) - June 1953)
- Chef de bataillon Mollo (June 1953)
