= 2nd Division (South Vietnam) =

2nd Infantry Division
- Sư đoàn 2 Bộ binh
- 2nd Division SSI
- Active: October 1955 – 1975
- Country: South Vietnam
- Branch: Army of the Republic of Vietnam
- Role: Infantry
- Part of: I Corps
- Garrison/HQ: Chu Lai
- Engagements: Vietnam War: Operation Quyet Thang 202; Operation Piranha; Operation Harvest Moon/Lien Ket 18; Operation Texas; Operation Colorado/Lien Ket 52; Operation Lien Ket 106; Operation Pocahontas Forest; Easter Offensive; War of the flags; Hue–Da Nang Campaign

Commanders
- Notable commanders: Tôn Thất Đính; Hoàng Xuân Lãm; Nguyễn Văn Toàn; Phan Hòa Hiệp; Trần Văn Nhựt

Insignia
- Division flag

The 2nd Infantry Division (Vietnamese: Sư đoàn 2 Bộ binh) was a division of the Army of the Republic of Vietnam (ARVN)—the army of the nation state of South Vietnam that existed from 1955 to 1975. It was part of I Corps that oversaw the northernmost region of South Vietnam.

== History ==
The 2nd Division's origins began with the 32nd Mobile Group, organised by the French on 1 February 1955 in the Red River Delta of North Vietnam. After 1954 Geneva accords, the group was transported to Đà Nẵng and reorganised as the 32nd Infantry Division. In 1960, the 2nd Field Division was redesignated the 2nd Infantry Division.

The 2nd Division was based in Chu Lai, south of Tam Kỳ, Quảng Tín Province and the 4th Cavalry Squadron was also located here. Each of the division's regiments was assigned a separate province: the 4th Regiment was based at Firebase Bronco (15.013°N 108.628°E) in Quảng Ngãi Province; the 5th Regiment was based at Hội An Base Camp in Quảng Nam Province and the 6th Regiment was based at Firebase Artillery Hill (15.402°N 108.684°E) in Quảng Tín Province. Given its large territorial responsibilities the division was supported by six Border Ranger Battalions.

=== 1964 ===
From 16 February until June 1964, the division conducted Operations Dan Chien I and II in Quảng Tín and Quảng Nam provinces respectively.

In April–May, a battalion from the division took part in Operation Quyet Thang 202.

On 9 August, two Viet Cong (VC) battalions attacked the command post of the 2nd Battalion, 4th Infantry, which was performing pacification operations around Thanh My in southern Quảng Tín. The task force commander, Lieutenant colonel Nhan, personally led the relief force, which consisted of a rifle company and a troop of M114 armored fighting vehicles. The advance continued even after a recoilless rifle knocked out the command M114, with South Vietnamese artillery and United States Army (US Army) helicopter gunships hitting the flanking hills. After rockets started a grass fire among the VC positions, the VC broke and ran with the M114s in pursuit. The allies killed 74 VC.

On 20 November, the division engaged VC who were searching for food 14km west of Quảng Nam. ARVN losses were three dead, 19 wounded and three weapons lost. VC losses were 67 killed, 17 captured and 24 weapons captured.

On 9 December, a VC battalion attacked and overran an ARVN outpost on Hill 159 8km southwest of Tam Kỳ and attacked an outpost at Ky Long 5km further west. A division force, supported by US Marine and Army helicopters, counter-attacked Hill 159 forcing the VC to retreat. VC losses were 162 killed and two captured and five machineguns, a 57mm recoilless rifle, and 51 individual weapons captured. ARVN losses were 26 dead and 43 wounded, one US advisor was killed.

=== 1965 ===
On 7 January, the VC attacked a post 23km northwest of the city at Viet An, where an infantry company guarded a platoon of 155mm howitzers and the headquarters of the 3rd Battalion, 6th Infantry. The defenders fought stubbornly before being forced to withdraw. Republic of Vietnam Air Force (VNAF) aircraft then hit the post with 24 sorties. A relief force comprising a ranger and two infantry battalions and an armored cavalry troop was sent to the post. A VC ambush was detected and the ARVN successfully attacked forcing the VC to flee. ARVN losses were 37 dead, 45 wounded, and four missing and 33 individual and three crew-served weapons were lost. The VC left 230 dead, including a battalion commander, seven prisoners, and 35 individual and five crew-served weapons.

On 20 January, the division launched a block-and-sweep operation 18km northwest of Tam Kỳ. VC losses were 28 killed and 36 captured. The ARVN suffered one dead and four wounded.

On 17 February, the division attacked a VC battalion on a ridge 30km northwest of Tam Ky. Two battalions and a ranger company advanced south from Qui Son, while a detached company assumed a blocking position behind the VC. As the infantry approached the Nui Lac San Ridge, one of the battalion commanders violated instructions to remain concentrated. He dispersed his troops causing the attack to fall apart. The VC charged down the ridge and a melee ensued until the ARVN were able to withdraw covered by airstrikes. ARVN losses were 41 dead, 18 wounded, and seven missing along with 39 weapons. VC losses were unknown, but multiple sources indicated that the airstrikes had killed several hundred.

On 23 February, the 39th Ranger Battalion and 5th Infantry Regiment troops were landed by US helicopters to raid eight VC-held hamlets on a peninsula 32km southeast of Đà Nẵng. Assisted by armor and a Regional Forces (RF) company that came overland, the troops converged, killing 93 VC and capturing ten.

On 3 March, the division mounted an operation to evacuate the Viet An outpost in Quảng Tín province which had been under siege by the VC since 7 February. The allies killed 120 VC, with villagers reporting that the VC had carried off another 150 casualties. ARVN losses were 25 dead, 35 wounded and five missing.

On 31 March in Operation Quyet Thang 512, the division planned to sweep a 200 square km area near Viet An. After US helicopter gunships hit the wrong target, the VC were able to shoot down a US Army troop carrying helicopter as it approached the landing zone. Anticipating the assault, the VC engaged the troops of the 5th Airborne Battalion as they landed and hit many of the helicopters. At 14:00, the 2nd and 3rd Battalions, 5th Infantry, and M113 armored personnel carriers began moving toward the besieged airborne. The 3rd Battalion and the M113s got within 2km of the airborne when the commander ordered the infantry to secure a small hill instead, leaving the M113s to continue to the landing zone. Meanwhile, the VC forced the 2nd Battalion to fall back. A half hour later, five VNAF A-1s arrived to assist the 2nd Battalion and the airborne. The VC, however, staged a fierce attack on the 3rd Battalion, assisted by ARVN artillery that mistakenly hit the infantry. The 3rd Battalion broke, with the VC chasing the soldiers into an open field where they were dangerously exposed. Earlier reports had led COMUSMACV General William Westmoreland to invoke his emergency powers and at the critical moment, F–100s and B–57s zoomed in at low level and hit the VC, saving the 3rd Battalion from possible annihilation. Throughout the night, the VC probed the 5th Airborne's perimeter. At 05:00 on 1 April, they launched an assault that failed. They then faded back into the jungle. ARVN losses were 21 dead, 66 wounded, and 20 missing and 32 individual and two crew-served weapons. The US lost two dead and 19 wounded. The VC shot down two one Army and one Marine Corps helicopters and damaged all the others used in the operation. The allies found 70 VC dead and estimated that they lost an additional 270 men. Nineteen individual weapons and one 57mm recoilless rifle were recovered.

On 18 April, the division massed six battalions and six platoons of artillery backed by aircraft to target the headquarters of the VC 1st Regiment, four infantry battalions, and an artillery company in the Viet An area of Quảng Tín province. Two columns moved southwest from Thang Binh district town into the hilly piedmont. The southern axis met stiff and mounting resistance by an estimated two battalions deployed on three hills. After a series of airstrikes, a company from the 3rd Marine Battalion made a lodgment on one of the hills while the rest of the battalion and two troops of M113s swept around the VC southern flank and hit the main position on a second knoll. Considerable amounts of bloody clothing found near the combat hamlet of Thanh Yen supported villager reports that the airstrikes had killed about 150 VC. The ARVN spent the night on the battlefield. On the following afternoon an observation aircraft reported seeing VC moving further west toward the hamlet of Chien Son. After a brief artillery bombardment, the 3rd Marine Battalion and the two cavalry troops advanced in line across a field toward the hamlet. At 17:25, the VC unleashed a bombardment including heavy 4.2 inch mortars. Surprised by the large explosions the M113s turned about and drove off the battlefield, causing the marines to panic and flee. Friendly artillery stopped firing, and the USAF forward air controller on the scene was unable to persuade two VNAF A-1s on station to attack. The Marine officers and their advisers could not stop the rout, but they did manage to steer the mob toward an abandoned VC trench where the marines stopped to take shelter. Here, allied officers organized a defense. The respite was brief as VC troops adjusted their bombardment to hit the new position, and a large column maneuvered to attack. Four advisers fell wounded, and, despite the best efforts of the remaining officers and advisers, the marines broke again. The division headquarters again rejected calls for artillery support on the supposition that the VC was too close to the marines, but the division commander, General Hoàng Xuân Lãm, ordered a ranger battalion and an infantry battalion to come to their aid. That plan backfired when the panic that infected the marines spread to the new battalions, which quickly joined the rout. The debacle cost the allies 26 dead, 86 wounded, 28 missing, and eight crew-served and 25 individual weapons lost. The allies counted 53 VC dead and estimated they had killed 297 more, but MACV considered the latter number highly speculative.

On 12 June, the division sent two understrength battalions and two Regional Forces companies to attack two VC local force companies 20km south of Đà Nẵng. VC losses were 41 killed, three captured and ten weapons. The allies estimated the VC had evacuated another 58 dead.

On 19 June, the division launched an attack on the VC 38th Battalion and a local force company 10km south of Quảng Ngãi. After encircling the target, the 2nd Battalion, 1st Infantry, on loan from the 1st Infantry Division, and a troop of M113s entered the area. Heavy fire from Thuan Hoa village led to an air and artillery bombardment followed by a successful assault backed by the M113s. Inside the advisers found two rings of trenches protected by barbed wire and bunkers whose roofs were over a meter thick. After securing Thuan Hoa, the battalion encountered light mortar fire while advancing on Hoa Que hamlet and fell back to Thuan Hoa for the night. On the 20th, the 2nd Battalion and another battalion advanced again toward Hoa Que, and again fell back in the face of light VC resistance. The division then terminated the operation, without conducting the planned three days of searches meant to reestablish government control in the area. VC losses were 63 killed and 16 weapons captured. ARVN losses were five dead and nine missing.

On 23 June, the division launched a raid 3km northeast of Quảng Ngãi, in response to information as to the whereabouts of the VC 90th Battalion. Two battalions advanced, backed by an M113 troop. The force overcame strongpoints with air and artillery support. ARVN losses were three killed and three wounded. VC losses were 66 killed and 28 individual weapons and one 57mm recoilless rifle captured.

From 7 to 10 September, the 2nd Battalion, 4th Regiment participated in Operation Piranha on the Batangan Peninsula with the 3rd Marine Battalion and US Marine forces.

On 8 December, the division's 1st Battalion, 5th Regiment participated in Operation Harvest Moon/Lien Ket 18 in the Quế Sơn Valley with the 11th Ranger Battalion and the US 3rd Marine Division's Task Force Delta. On the morning of 8 December the ARVN began their advance along Route 534 with the 1st Battalion on the left of the road and the 11th Rangers on the right. At 13:30 the Rangers walked into an ambush by the VC 70th Battalion which was overrun within 15 minutes, losing a third of their men, the remainder withdrew and established a defensive perimeter 1.2 km northwest and called for air support. The 1st Regiment was prevented from reinforcing the Rangers by intensive small arms and mortar fire and Marine airstrikes hit the VC positions. Later that day HMM-161 helicopters flew in the division's 6th Regiment from Tam Kỳ to replace the 11th Rangers. At 06:45 on 9 December the VC 60th and 80th Battalions hit the ARVN 1st Battalion position, overrunning the battalion and 5th Regiment command posts and killing the 5th Regiment commander and scattering the remaining ARVN forces. The VC launched a simultaneous assault on the 6th Regiment position to the north which was repulsed. At 10:00 HMM-161 and HMM-361 helicopters began landing the 2nd Battalion 7th Marines 9 km west of the ARVN position and they moved northeast, establishing a defensive position 2.5 km from their landing zone by late afternoon. At 14:00 HMM-261 began landing the 3rd Battalion, 3rd Marines 2.5 km southeast of the ARVN 1st Battalion and by 15:30 they had made contact with the ARVN. As the 3/3 Marines continued advancing northwest towards Hill 43 they encountered a force of approximately 200 VC in a fight that continued until dusk when the VC withdrew. The operation concluded on 20 December, the Marines had lost 45 killed, the ARVN 90 killed and 91 missing and the VC 407 killed and 33 captured.

In late 1965, Westmoreland and his chief of staff of operations, General William E. DePuy, blamed the division's temerity on its "less aggressive" commander, Lãm, who had been either unwilling or unable to get the division moving during the year.

=== 1966-1971 ===
From 20 to 25 March 1966, the division's 2nd and 3rd Battalions, 5th Regiment participated in Operation Texas with the ARVN 5th Airborne Battalion and elements of the US 1st Marine Division fighting elements from the 21st and 1st Regiments of the People's Army of Vietnam (PAVN) 2nd Infantry Division around Hill 141 northwest of Quảng Ngãi.

In late May 1966, Lãm was promoted to I Corps commander, becoming the sixth I Corps commander in the northern zone in less than three months in the aftermath of the Buddhist Uprising.

From 6 to 22 August 1966, the division's 2nd and 4th Battalions participated in Operation Colorado/Lien Ket 52 with three Vietnamese Marine Battalions and elements of the US 1st Marine Division against the PAVN 2nd Division in the Hiệp Đức District.

From 26 to 30 May 1967, the division's 6th Regiment conducted Operation Lien Ket 106 with the ARVN 1st Ranger Group and in coordination with the US 5th Marine Regiment's Operation Union II in the Quế Sơn Valley against the PAVN 2nd Division.

From 6 to 31 July 1968, the division's 2nd and 4th Battalions, 5th Regiment, supported by an artillery battery participated in Operation Pocahontas Forest a security operation with the US Americal Division in the Quế Sơn Valley. Throughout 1968 and 1969 the division was paired with the Americal Division and the subordinate brigades and regiments of the two units conducted a series of intensive combined operations. Although encountering little sizeable enemy resistance, US commanders judged the endeavor a success.

On 23 August 1968, during the Phase III Offensive south of Đà Nẵng the division and two Ranger battalions with US Marine air support repulsed probing attacks from the PAVN 31st and 38th Regiments, killing almost 300 PAVN before they withdrew to their bases on Go Noi Island.

From 20 November to 9 December 1968, the 4th Armored Cavalry Squadron participated in Operation Meade River a 1st Marine Division cordon and search operation against the PAVN base area known as Dodge City south of Đà Nẵng.

=== 1972 ===
In January 1972, General Phan Hòa Hiệp replaced General Nguyễn Văn Toàn as commander of the division.

During the Easter Offensive of May 1972, the 4th Regiment was moved north to reinforce the Mỹ Chánh Line northwest of Huế. The PAVN 2nd Division mounted diversionary operations in Quảng Ngãi Province which were countered by the division.

ARVN MRI Military Balance in Dec 1972

On 18 August 1972, following an artillery barrage by 130mm guns the PAVN 711th Division attacked and captured Quế Sơn town and Firebase Ross, including 15-20 of the then secret TOW missiles among the abandoned equipment. The division's 5th Regiment troops defending Ross were said to have failed to carry out their mission. On 24 August the 5th Regiment commander, Colonel Nguyen Van Lu and a battalion commander, were arrested for their role in losing Ross and it was reported that as many as 2,500 ARVN troops remained unaccounted for. On 25 August, Brigadier general Phan Hòa Hiệp was relieved of command for the loss of Firebase Ross, which was described as the worst South Vietnamese defeat since the height of the Easter Offensive with the division rendered temporarily combat ineffective. Hiệp was replaced by Colonel Trần Văn Nhựt, the province chief of Bình Long. An investigation found that Hiệp "lacked experience in divisional command" and his performance was compared to that of 3rd Infantry Division commander General Vũ Văn Giai who was held responsible for the disintegration of that division after the First Battle of Quảng Trị. A U.S. adviser said that Nhựt's promotion was "clearly based on merit."

The division fought heavy actions in southern Quảng Tín and Quảng Ngãi in late 1972. In late September the 5th Regiment and the 77th Ranger Battalion failed in a tardy effort to save Tiên Phước District Town in Quảng Tín Province, but the town was subsequently recaptured by the 2nd Regiment, 3rd Division. Meanwhile, reinforced by the 4th Tank Ballalion, the 78th Ranger Battalion, and the 2nd Ranger Group, the division's 4th and 5th Regiments cleared the PAVN 52nd Regiment, 2nd Division and elements of the PAVN 3rd Division from Mộ Đức District and Đức Phổ, two important towns on Highway 1. After participating in the Tiên Phước success, the 6th Regiment returned to the division from the 3rd Division and, with the 1st Ranger Group, operated east of Highway 1 in the Batangan Peninsula and around My Lai. An attempt by the 5th Regiment to retake the highland district town of Ba Tơ, was unsuccessful. Opposing the division in Quảng Ngãi were the 1st, 52nd and 141st Regiments of the PAVN 3rd Infantry Division from its bases in northern Binh Dinh Province. (Note: The PAVN had four 52nd Regiments at the time: one of the 320B Division in B5 Front, one of the 320A Division in B3 Front, one swapped between the 2nd and the 3rd Divisions in B1 Front, one of the 1st Division in B2 Front. The 52nd Regiment of B1 Front was redesignated the independent 52nd Brigade later.)

=== 1973–1974 ===
During the War of the flags that preceded the signing of the Paris Peace Accords in Quảng Ngãi Province between 23 and 26 January 1973, VC forces infiltrated into assembly areas in the lowlands and on 27 January attacked throughout the lowlands, rocketing the provincial and district capitals, interdicting Highway 1 and overrunning several Regional Force and Popular Force outposts. In southern Quảng Ngãi, the PAVN 52nd Regiment, 2nd Division, established defenses around the Ba Tơ district town, which it had controlled since late 1972. Rather than challenge this position, the division deployed to prevent the 52nd Regiment from moving toward the lowlands. Holding its 1st Regiment in reserve, the PAVN 2nd Division used one battalion to support VC forces in Mộ Đức District, kept one battalion in the base area, and deployed the third to support the attack of the 141st Regiment in Đức Thọ District. On 27 January the 141st Regiment, supported by two battalions of the PAVN 12th Regiment, 3rd Division reached Highway 1 south of Đức Thọ and secured the rest of the district south to the border of Bình Định Province, including Sa Huỳnh Base, in which two battalions of the PAVN 12th Regiment, 3rd Division, supported the attack of the 2nd Division. Since the PAVN had blocked the only north - south line of communication and had secured a seaport, however small and undeveloped, in the center of the country and the Accords stipulated a ceasefire in place, the ARVN could hardly permit this situation to go unchallenged. Vigorous counterattacks by the division succeeded in driving the PAVN from Sa Huỳnh by 16 February. PAVN losses were estimated to be in excess of 600 killed. Despite having seized Sa Huỳnh only the day before the ceasefire, the PAVN were outraged at being ejected from lands they "legitimately" occupied at the moment of ceasefire.

Following their victory at Sa Huỳnh the division was to support Regional and Popular Forces in clearing the lowlands west of Highway 1 of the remnants of VC units. By October, the division could claim substantial success in this mission, and the emphasis shifted to continuing the pressure on local VC units until they withdrew into the foothills. The division's battalions, reinforced with Rangers and RF/PF pushed into the piedmont to block the VC's supply lines to the coast, find and destroy supply bases, deny access to the rice harvest, protect refugee villages, and secure Highway 1 against VC attack. Added to these general missions was one very specific requirement, imposed not only by orders from I Corps but compelled by the honor of the division: defend Sa Huỳnh. The 4th Regiment was assigned this mission, keeping two battalions entrenched in the hills overlooking the small fishing village. The 4th, with one RF battalion attached and another under the command of the district chief, was responsible for security in Duc Pho District of Quảng Ngãi, but its control extended scarcely 5 km west of Highway 1. The 5th Regiment had missions parallel to the 4th, but operated in the central coastal district of Mộ Đức. The 5th was reinforced by two RF battalions, but its success in maneuvering west of Highway I was also limited, although security along the highway was reasonably well maintained. The 6th Regiment was responsible for the sector from Chu Lai to the division boundary north of Tam Ky and like the other two Regiments, engaged in numerous contacts with local VC through the fall and winter of 1973. There were 6 major bridges and at least 25 shorter spans along the stretch of Highway 1 in the division sector. All had to be protected and the mission was nearly always assigned to RF/PF forces. VC sappers got to the Sa Bau Bridge south of Tam Ky on 26 December and dropped it in the river. On Christmas they blew up the Tra Can Bridge in Duc Pho District, right under the noses of an RF Company. Brig. Gen. Trần Văn Nhựt, the division commander was so incensed at this debacle, the RF Company commander had been warned that a VC unit was seen reconnoitering for the attack, that he threw the captain in jail. According to General Nhựt at the time, at least a part of the problem of territorial ineffectiveness in Quảng Ngãi Province was traceable to the fact that a very high percentage of the RF/PF and Peoples' Self-Defense Force troops had relatives in the VC ranks; family loyalties often took precedence over military orders and duties.

On 4 May 1974, a battalion of PAVN infantry overran the village of Nui Ya and then attacked Ky Tra, a sprawling village on a minor road junction in the hills west of Chu Lai. Mortar, rocket and artillery fire fell on the defending 931st RF Company, two PF platoons and about 60 People's Self-Defense Force militia. While Ky Tra was under attack, all four ARVN fire support bases within range came under heavy mortar and rocket fire. Contact was lost with the defenders on 5 May as the PAVN 1st Infantry Regiment, 2nd Division, occupied Ky Tra. This maneuver placed a major PAVN force in position to support attacks against the line of communication to Tiên Phước District and to block overland movement to Hau Duc. The attack on Ky Tra signalled the eruption of attacks by fire and ground attacks on ARVN bases and outposts throughout Quảng Ngãi and Quảng Tín Provinces. A relief column headed by the 1st Battalion, 4th Regiment, was hit by heavy PAVN mortar and rocket fire 9 km from Ky Tra. A battalion of the 6th Regiment also failed to reach Ky Tra. Meanwhile, the PAVN 31st Regiment, 2nd Division, launched an attack on outposts protecting Tiên Phước, and one ARVN position, held by the 131st RF Battalion, was lost, The attacks continued on 16 and 17 May, but two RF battalions at Tiên Phước repelled the 31st Regiment attacks with heavy losses. On 19 May, the PAVN 1st Regiment again attacked the 1st Battalion, 4th Regiment, the understrength ARVN battalion broke and lost nearly 200 weapons and 13 field radios, impossible to replace, in the rout. While the infantry fought in the hills, the PAVN pounded the division headquarters at Chu Lai and the city of Tam Ky and its airfield with 122-mm. rockets. Brig. Gen. Nhựt sent the 12th Ranger Group, under his operational control, to reinforce Tiên Phước. Although the PAVN 31st Regiment continued to attack, it was unable to break through to Tiên Phước. In early June, the 12th Ranger Group was relieved by the 5th Regiment and they succeeded in holding Tiên Phước and keeping the road open to Tam Ky. Losses on both sides were heavy, and by mid-June the 1st Battalion, 4th Regiment and the 2nd and 3rd Battalions, 6th Regiment were combat ineffective due to casualties and equipment losses. The 5th Regiment had also suffered moderate losses since 1 June on the Quảng Tín battlefield, mostly along the Tam Ky-Tiên Phước road and was only marginally effective. Likewise, the 12th Ranger Group, which had distinguished itself in the defense at Tiên Phước was badly understrength because of high casualties. General Nhựt had two other Ranger groups, the 11th and 14th, committed to forward positions in the hills and kept his 4th Armored Cavalry Group as division reserve. Throughout the Tiên Phước-Ky Tra battle, Nhựt had to contend with serious threats to the security of coastal Quảng Ngãi. There the PAVN 52nd Brigade maintained pressure against lines of communication and population centers, defended largely by RF and PF units whose usual performance under main-force enemy attacks was desultory at best. However on 5 May south of Nghĩa Hành District, the PAVN 9th Battalion, 52nd Regiment reinforced by the 15th Engineer Battalion, 52nd Brigade, attacked the l17th RF Battalion, but the attack was repelled, leaving 21 dead and a number of weapons at the RF defensive position. PAVN soldiers in this battle were disguised in ARVN uniforms, a tactic frequently seen. The increase in enemy attacks during May was not confined to the coast, however. In southwest Quảng Ngãi, on the boundary of Kontum Province, the 70th ARVN Ranger Battalion engaged in heavy fighting with an enemy force east of Gia Vuc in mid-May.

The demands for reinforcements in Quảng Nam Province and in the Quế Sơn Valley had spread the ARVN very thin in Quảng Ngãi Province, which had been boiling with enemy activity since early summer. The division had conducted fairly successful pacification and security operations in Quảng Ngãi. but the vast expanse of territory it had to cover was vulnerable to hit-and-run attacks. Furthermore, a number of ARVN outposts were deep in the hills beyond supporting or quick reinforcing distance. The principal adversary opposing the ARVN in Quảng Ngãi was still the PAVN 52nd Brigade, which had four infantry battalions, a sapper battalion, and supporting artillery. The brigade had its battalions deployed west of Highway 1 and south of Nghĩa Hành District Town in position to threaten the populated areas of Mộ Đức and Đức Phổ, as well as the mountain district seats at Sơn Hà, Trà Bồng, and Minh Long and the frontier outpost of Gia Vuc in the far western edge of Ba To District. Five other battalions of local sappers and infantry were disposed close to Highway 1 from the northern district of Bình Sơn south to Đức Phổ, and one battalion had infiltrated into the Batangan Peninsula east of Bình Sơn. Augmenting the division in Quảng Ngãi Province were 12 RF battalions and 3 battalions of the 11th Ranger Group. The 68th Ranger Battalion was at Sơn Hà District Town, over the mountains west of Quảng Ngãi City; the 69th Ranger Battalion was in Trà Bồng, up the Trà Bồng River from Bình Sơn; and the 70th Ranger Battalion was still defending the outpost at Gia Vuc. Timing operations with the opening of the offensive in Quảng Nam Province, the PAVN initiated heavy attacks by fire and ground assaults throughout Quảng Ngãi on the night of 19 July 1974. The following morning, PAVN gunners fired at the base at Chu Lai with eight 122-mm. rockets but caused no damage. Attacks continued for five days before the intensity began to fall off.

On 1 August 1974, with the 3rd Division heavily engaged at Thượng Đức and Duc Duc, responsibility for the Quế Sơn Valley was transferred to the division. The 57th Regiment, 3rd Division minus a battalion attached to the 2nd Infantry in Duc Duc, was attached to the division in the Quế Sơn Valley, and the 4th Regiment was deployed to the valley from Bình Sơn District in Quảng Ngãi Province to be the I Corps reserve south of the Hải Vân Pass. To compensate for the 4th Regiment's departure, the 5th Regiment was moved to Binh Son, and the 6th Regiment took over the 5th Regiment's mission in Đức Phổ District. Only RF/PF and a few Rangers were left in the threatened Mộ Đức District of Quảng Ngãi. The 4th Regiment was immediately engaged by two PAVN battalions between Firebase Baldy and Quế Sơn. Although no more important positions were lost, fighting continued sporadically for the rest of the year in the Quế Sơn Valley.

Heavy PAVN attacks flared again on 3 and 4 August in the central district of Nghĩa Hành. In the hills south of the district town in the Cong Hoa Valley, the 118th RF Battalion was overrun following a heavy artillery concentration. Two battalions, one RF and the other from the 5th Regiment, were sent to reinforce the 118th, but they arrived too late to rescue the position. Trưởng and Nhựt saw the hard-won gains of the summer slipping away. There were no spectacular PAVN initiatives: just a gradual erosion of security as one small position after another fell to short, violent enemy assaults. But with so few troops available, ARVN commanders could do little to halt the decline, much less restore the earlier situation. The first of the district headquarters to fall during the PAVN offensive was Minh Long when elements of the PAVN 52nd Brigade overran the two defending RF Companies on 17 August. Outposts held by the 15 local PF platoons collapsed quickly under the weight of PAVN artillery. A platoon of 105mm. artillery was soon out of action, its howitzers damaged by PAVN fire. A three-battalion ARVN relief force failed to make any headway, and PAVN trucks were seen hauling ammunition into Minh Long on 23 August. Three days after the fall of Minh Long. Nhựt asked Trưởng for permission to withdraw the 70th Ranger Battalion from Gia Vuc, now completely isolated and exposed to PAVN attack. Nhựt also wanted to pull the 68th and 69th Rangers out of Sơn Hà and Trà Bồng because these battalions had poor prospects for survival against heavy PAVN firepower. Trưởng understood, but he would not agree to abandoning any districts to the PAVN without a fight. Artillery fire on Gia Vuc began on 19 September, followed shortly by ground assaults. Five outposts fell, but the Rangers moved out quickly and retook three of them. But without artillery support or airstrikes due to bad weather and losing 50 men killed and as many wounded, the 70th Ranger Battalion was unable to hold. The camp fell on 21 September. Only 21 survivors eventually made it back to ARVN lines. Some help for beleaguered Quảng Ngãi Province appeared on 1 October when the 4th Regiment, returned to Chu Lai from its operations in the Quế Sơn Valley to try to recover the terrain lost to the PAVN south of Nghĩa Hành District Town. Well entrenched, the PAVN had even moved a battery of 37mm antiaircraft guns to within 4 km of the district town, but the guns were soon destroyed by ARVN artillery. The PAVN force blocking the 4th Regiment's advance included three battalions of the 52nd Brigade. The 4th Regiment took heavy casualties but made no significant gains.

In December, the reconstituted battalions of the 14th Ranger Group from Quảng Nam Province reinforced the 6th Regiment in heavy fighting on the Batangan Peninsula. Casualties were high, but the improvements to local security were slight. As the year ended in Quảng Ngãi, the advantage and initiative lay in PAVN hands. RF/PF forces were understrength and dispirited; the once-effective division could field battalions of only 300 men each, and Ranger battalions were sorely fatigued from continual combat. The PAVN's strategic raids campaign in the vast region south of the Hải Vân Pass had accomplished three things that placed PAVN forces in an excellent position to begin a major offensive. First, although PAVN casualties were very high, the campaign had severely depleted the ARVN of experienced leaders and soldiers. Replacements were not well-trained or in sufficient numbers to bring battered battalions up to strength. On the other hand, the PAVN replacement now was copious and free from interference. Second, PAVN command, staff, logistics, and communications had been thoroughly expanded and proven during this campaign; the new 3rd Corps had the valuable experience of a major offensive behind it. Third, the PAVN had pushed its holdings to the edge of the narrow coastal plain and was within artillery range of nearly every major South Vietnamese installation and population center. Similar progress, meanwhile, was being made north of the Hải Vân Pass.

=== 1975 ===
In Quảng Ngãi Province, the PAVN's offensive was delayed by an aggressive clearing operation, Operation Quyet Thanh A-1-75 in Nghĩa Hành District. The 4th Regiment was involved in sharp fighting there on 6 and 7 March and PAVN casualties were substantial.

On 10 March, two battalions of the PAVN 31st Regiment, 2nd Division, attacked Tiên Phước from the north and west, while elements of the PAVN 1st Regiment struck from the south and southeast. In Hau Duc, another battalion of the PAVN 31st Regiment, with supporting local forces, overran the 102nd RF Battalion. Refugees from both districts began streaming into Tam Ky, the province capital, which itself was hit by PAVN 122mm. rockets on 11 March and the major base at Chu Lai also received a rocket bombardment. Remnants of the 116th and 134th RF Battalions decimated in Tiên Phước, also straggled eastward toward Tam Ky. The 115th RF Battalion left its positions on Ban Quan Mountain east of Tiên Phước and withdrew toward Tam Ky, but left four howitzers to the PAVN. The 3rd Battalion, 5th Regiment with the 115th RF Battalion, counterattacked at My Mountain, the last important high ground on Route 533 between Tam Ky and Tiên Phước and regained the position only to be driven off again by intense artillery fire. General Nhựt organized a relief column to push out from Tam Ky and protect the withdrawal of the territorials and civilians from Tiên Phước. The PAVN however, held the high ground overlooking the column's approach, including a prominent hill called Nui Ngoc. On 11 March the column, composed of the 37th and 39th Ranger Battalions and the 1st Battalion, 5th Regiment, stalled short of Nui Ngoc. On 12 March, Nhựt sent the 5th Infantry Regiment from Quảng Ngãi Province and deployed it west of Tam Ky. Its three battalions were in depth along Route 533, the forward elements just east of My Mountain. Two RF battalions, the 115th and 135th were north of the 5th Infantry, between Route 533 and the Ranger task force below Nui Ngoc. The 21st Ranger Battalion was behind the 135th RF, west of Tam Ky. Thus, General Nhựt had nine battalions west of Tam Ky, as a strong PAVN force was about to continue the attack toward that city. Furthermore, Tam Ky was now within range of the PAVN's light artillery.

On 14 March, Trưởng met with General Lâm Quang Thi, commanding I Corps troops in Quảng Trị and Thua Thien Provinces, and General Lan, the Marine Division commander, to explain his concept for the final defense of Đà Nẵng. He would pull all combat forces into Quảng Nam and defend Đà Nẵng with the 1st, 3rd and Marine Divisions on line and the 2nd Division in reserve, but this deployment would be approached gradually as divisional troops were relieved in Quang Tri and Thua Thien Provinces and terrain in the southern part of the region was abandoned. Trưởng ordered the immediate evacuation of all military units, including the 68th Ranger Battalion at Sơn Hà and the 69th Ranger Battalion at Trà Bồng and all civilians in both areas who wanted to leave. Trưởng ordered Nhựt to keep his 6th Regiment south of Nghĩa Hành town to protect Quảng Ngãi City. The PAVN attacked strongly throughout Quảng Ngãi on 14 and 15 March, overrunning outposts all around the province capital. Quảng Ngãi territorials, never strong, had been weakened further by the departure of the 5th Regiment for Quảng Tín Province and the shift of most of the 4th Regiment to division reserve in Chu Lai. Only two regular battalions, the 70th Ranger and the 3rd Battalion, 4th Regiment, remained south of Mộ Đức; only three RF battalions between Mộ Đức and the Bình Định boundary. In the northern sectors, on the night of 15/16 March, a PAVN attack destroyed five PF platoons north of Bình Sơn and closed Highway 1 to the Quảng Tín boundary. In Quảng Tín, the PAVN attacked north of Tam Ky close to Highway 1 and overran an RF company north of the city on 15 March. When the PAVN also struck west of Tam Ky, the 5th Regiment and the 12th Ranger Group fell back and the 37th Ranger Battalion was routed.

The evacuation of Sơn Hà and Trà Bồng got under way on 16 March as two CH-47 helicopters began lifting out civilians. The 68th Ranger Battalion, 17 RF platoons, and over 400 PSDF soldiers were flown to Sơn Tịnh District, north of Quảng Ngãi City. Many of the 12,000 residents of Trà Bồng began moving along the road to Bình Sơn, protected by the 69th Rangers. Also in the column were a battery of territorial artillery, an RF company, 22 PF platoons and 600 PSDF militia. As the 25 km trek began, the PAVN attacked outposts north of Bình Sơn and severed Highway 1 between that town and Chu Lai. PAVN artillery shelled Bình Sơn causing light civilian casualties while PAVN infantry wiped out several outposts south in Sơn Tịnh District. Meanwhile, Nhựt moved the 2nd Battalion, 6th Regiment from Nghĩa Hành to the western edge of Quảng Ngãi City.

By 20 March, despite the efforts of Nhựt to concentrate his forces for the defense Tam Ky, prospects were bleak. The city was struck by heavy rocket fire on 21 March. The 4th Regiment moved its command post to Tam Ky from Quảng Ngãi, the 1st Battalion, 6th Regiment, moved in from Bình Sơn District and the 916th RF Group headquarters moved down from Thang Binh with the 135th RF Battalion. The situation in Quảng Ngãi Province was becoming desperate although elements of the 4th Regiment succeeded in opening Highway 1 in Bình Sơn District, but west of Bình Sơn, the PAVN struck the long column of refugees and military fleeing from Trà Bồng; the 69th Rangers were ambushed and dispersed. The PAVN attack south of Đức Phổ cut Highway 1, isolating Sa Huỳnh and the two battalions defending it, the 70th Ranger and 137th RF Battalions. On 22 March, Trưởng gave Nhựt authority to consolidate his forces anyway he could to preserve combat strength.

Southwest of Tam Ky the 2d Battalion, 5th Regiment, had been in heavy combat since 12 March. Starting the campaign with 350 men, by 22 March the battalion was down to only 130, after heavy casualties and many desertions. Nhựt replaced it with the 2nd Battalion, 4th Regiment, committing the 4th Regiment southwest of Tam Ky, together with two battalions of the 5th Regiment and a company of tanks and sending the 1st Battalion, 6th Regiment, from Tam Ky to assist in the defense of Chu Lai. The 12th Ranger Group remained on Tam Ky's northwest perimeter.

The final PAVN assault on Tam Ky began on 24 March. Sappers breached the perimeter and by midmorning were in the center of the city, blowing up the power plant. Artillery fire was intense all along the line and by noon tanks and infantry broke through an RF battalion and the 3rd Battalion, 5th Regiment. That afternoon the city was lost and Trưởng ordered Nhựt to pull his forces out of Tam Ky and assemble them for the defense of Chu Lai. By this time, however. Nhựt no longer had enough control of the situation or of his units to comply fully with these orders. He managed to get the headquarters and one battalion of the 4th Regiment, plus some scattered fragments of other 4th Regiment units moving toward Chu Lai that evening. Two battalions of the 5th Regiment, scattered in the assault, also were assembling for the march south. Units on the northwest perimeter including the dispersed 12th Ranger Group and the staff of the division deputy commander were forced to withdraw north toward Quảng Nam, making it to Firebase Baldy just inside the Quảng Nam boundary on Highway 1. Trưởng also ordered the evacuation of all forces in Quảng Ngãi Province; they were also to assemble for the defense of Chu Lai. The feasibility of this task was strained by PAVN sappers who blew an important bridge on Highway 1 between Quảng Ngãi and Chu Lai.

On 25 March, Trưởng ordered the division to move to Đà Nẵng to join the defense of the city replacing the Marine Division which was to be withdrawn to the Saigon area. The sealift from Chu Lai would begin after dark on 25 March on Landing ship tanks (LSTs) en route from Saigon. Boats committed to the withdrawal of forces in Thua Thien Province would also assist at Chu Lai. While the shipping converged on Chu Lai, the battered 6th Regiment, was fighting its way toward Chu Lai from Quảng Ngãi. The Quảng Ngãi Province chief and his staff, unable to break through the PAVN units on the road to Chu Lai, went by boat to Re Island, 20 miles (32 km) offshore from Chu Lai. As an embattled column of soldiers and refugees struggled north on Highway 1 north of Quảng Ngãi, dead and wounded littered the road. Once the sealift from Chu Lai began, panic took over as soldiers fought for places on the first boats. Sufficient order was restored, however, to move about 7,000 soldiers up to Đà Nẵng. The remnants of the 4th Regiment and the almost nonexistent 6th Regiment were regrouped on Re Island while the 12th Ranger Group, down to only 500 men, and the few remaining soldiers of the 5th Regiment, were assembled near Đà Nẵng and most were captured when the city fell to the PAVN on 30 March.

On 1 April, about 500 troops, survivors of the division arrived in Bình Thuận Province. When reorganized and reequipped, they took over the security mission in Hàm Tân District. By 11 April the division, which had been reassembled at Hàm Tân, had grown to 3,600, including two RF battalions assigned to it from Gia Dinh Province. Due to the severely low morale among the troops and having only two battalions per regiment, Nhựt suggested that the division stay in Hàm Tân to defend the port and recover its strength. On 7 April, the III Corps commander, Gen. Toàn rejected Nhựt's request, and ordered him to prepare his division to move north to defend Phan Rang and Phan Thiết. On 13 April, the 4th and 5th Regiments arrived at Phan Rang Air Base by road from Phan Thiết to replace the 2nd Airborne Brigade which was being withdrawn to Saigon.

On 16 April, the PAVN began their final attack on Phan Rang AB. At 08:45 a battalion-sized PAVN mechanized force attacked along Route 11 towards the base. While one element attacked the 5th Regiment defending Route 11, the other moved around it to attack the base directly and at the same time the PAVN 25th Regiment attacked the north of the base. The 5th Regiment soon broke and ran allowing the PAVN to attack the base's main gate, while the 25th Regiment penetrated the north perimeter with explosives and captured the bomb storage area. The Airborne attempted a counterattack against the 25th Regiment, but were forced back and then squeezed between the PAVN and by 09:30 the PAVN had captured the base.

== Organisation ==
Component units:

- 4th Infantry Regiment
- 5th Infantry Regiment
- 6th Infantry Regiment
- 20th, 21st, 22nd and 23rd Artillery Battalions
- 4th Armored Cavalry Squadron
- US Advisory Team 2
