= Operation Pocahontas Forest =

Part of the Vietnam War (1968)

- Part of the Vietnam War
Date	6–31 July 1968
Location	Quế Sơn Valley, Quảng Nam Province, South Vietnam
Result	Allies claim operational success

Belligerents
United States; South Vietnam	North Vietnam

Commanders and leaders
MG Charles M. Gettys; BG Howard H. Cooksey	

Units involved
(United States) Americal Division (South Vietnam) 2nd Division	1st Regiment, 2nd Division

Casualties and losses
(United States) 18 killed	US/ARVN body count: 127 killed

Operation Pocahontas Forest was a security operation conducted during the Vietnam War by the U.S. Americal Division and the Army of the Republic of Vietnam (ARVN) 2nd Division in the Quế Sơn Valley, South Vietnam from 6 to 31 July 1968.

== Background ==
At the beginning of July, Allied intelligence indicated that the People's Army of Vietnam (PAVN) 1st Regiment, 2nd Division was operating near Hiệp Đức at the western end of the Quế Sơn Valley. General William B. Rosson ordered Major General Charles M. Gettys, commander of the Americal Division to secure the area.

== Operation ==
Operation Pocahontas Forest was launched on 6 July to search for the 1st Regiment and preempt a possible attack on Hiệp Đức.

MG Gettys formed a brigade-size task force under the command of his deputy Division commander BG Howard H. Cooksey. Task Force Cooksey comprised the 4th Battalion, 3rd Infantry Regiment, the 4th Battalion, 21st Infantry Regiment, the 4th Battalion, 31st Infantry Regiment, a mechanized platoon from Troop F, 17th Cavalry Regiment, a company from the 26th Engineer Battalion and four MIKE Force companies. The ARVN 2nd Division contributed a separate combat group comprising the 2nd and 4th Battalions, 5th Infantry Regiment, supported by an artillery battery.

During the initial phase of the operation the Allied force located some supply caches around Hiệp Đức, but did not make contact with the 1st Regiment.

On 11 July MG Gettys added the 5th Battalion, 46th Infantry Regiment, to Task Force Cooksey and on 21 July he added the 2nd Battalion, 1st Infantry Regiment, but even this expanded force made little contact with the PAVN.

== Aftermath ==
The operation ended on 31 July, with PAVN losses of 127 killed while U.S. losses were 18 killed. While the Allied forces had not engaged the 1st Regiment directly, it had succeeded in keeping them away from Hiệp Đức and improved security in the Quế Sơn Valley to allow for pacification.
