= Trần Văn Nhựt =

South Vietnamese brigadier general

- Born: 1935
- Died: 2015 (aged 79–80)
- Military career
- Allegiance: South Vietnam
- Branch: Vietnamese National Army; Army of the Republic of Vietnam
- Rank: Brigadier general
- Commands: 2nd Infantry Division
- Conflicts: Vietnam War: Battle of An Lộc; Battle of Phan Rang

Trần Văn Nhựt was a Brigadier general in the Army of the Republic of Vietnam (ARVN). He led Bình Long Territorial Forces in the Battle of An Lộc 1972, and the ARVN 2nd Infantry Division in the Battle of Phan Rang 1975.

== Military career ==
In 1968, as a commander of the ARVN 18th Infantry Division training center, Lieu. Col. Nhựt repulsed the attack on the center by the 275th Regiment of the PAVN 5th Infantry Division, infliciting heavy losses on the PAVN force. He was personally awarded the US Silver Star by Gen. Creighton Abrams for this achievement. In early 1970, Col. Nhựt was transferred from commander of the 48th Regiment of ARVN 18th Infantry Division to Bình Long province chief. Two years later, Nhựt led his Territorial Forces along with the ARVN 5th Infantry Division and 3rd Ranger Group fighting against the People's Army of Vietnam (PAVN) two-division combined forces during the two-month-long Siege of An Lộc, before relieved by the ARVN 1st Airborne Brigade and 21st Infantry Division.

After the Battle of An Lộc, Nhựt was transferred from III Corps to I Corps to command the ARVN 2nd Infantry Division, and promoted to Brigadier general. In late September 1972, although Nhựt's 5th Regiment and the 77th Ranger Ballalion failed to save Tiên Phước district town in Quảng Tín Province, the town was subsequently recaptured by the 2nd Regiment of ARVN 3rd Infantry Division. Meanwhile, his two other regiments: the 4th and the 6th, reinforced by the division's organic 4th Armored Squadron and the 2nd Ranger Group, successfully cleared the 52nd Regiment of PAVN 2nd Infantry Division, and elements of the PAVN 3rd Infantry Division from Mộ Đức and Đức Phổ, two important towns of Quảng Ngãi Province on Highway 1 (QL-1).

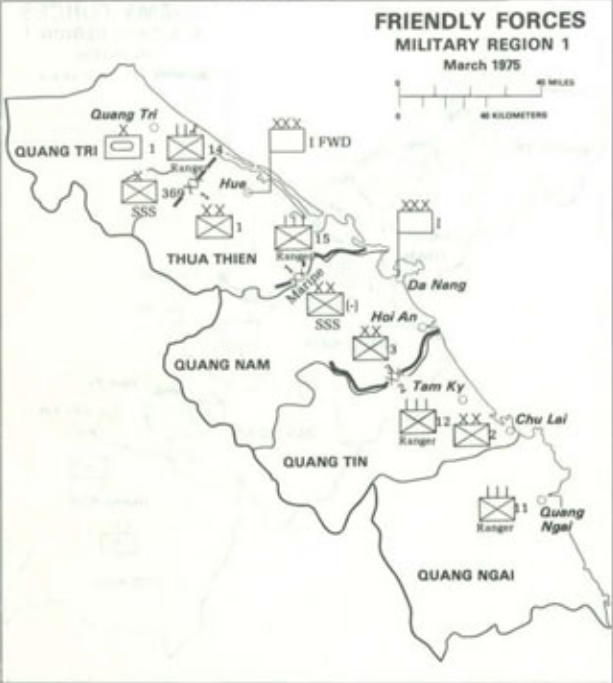
Deployment of South Vietnamese units in I Corps in March 1975

During 13–15 April 1975, Brig. Gen. Nhựt led his reconstituted division to Phan Rang to join with the ARVN 31st Ranger Group of Col. Nguyễn Văn Biết, and 2nd Airborne Brigade of Col. Nguyễn Thu Lương in the Battle of Phan Rang under Lt. Gen. Nguyễn Vĩnh Nghi.

After the Fall of Phan Rang on 16 April, seeing hopeless case, Gen. Nhựt privately instructed his 6th Regiment commander, who was defending Phan Thiết to flee rather than fight. On 10:30 PM of 19 April, the PAVN forces captured Phan Thiết with almost no resistance from the 6th Regiment.

== Later life ==
In 2009, Texas Tech University Press published An Lộc: The Unfinished War, an autobiography of Gen. Nhựt about the Battle of An Lộc 1972.

== Awards ==
- USA
  - Silver Star Medal
