= Oscar F. Peatross =

U.S. Marine Corps Major General

Oscar Franklin Peatross
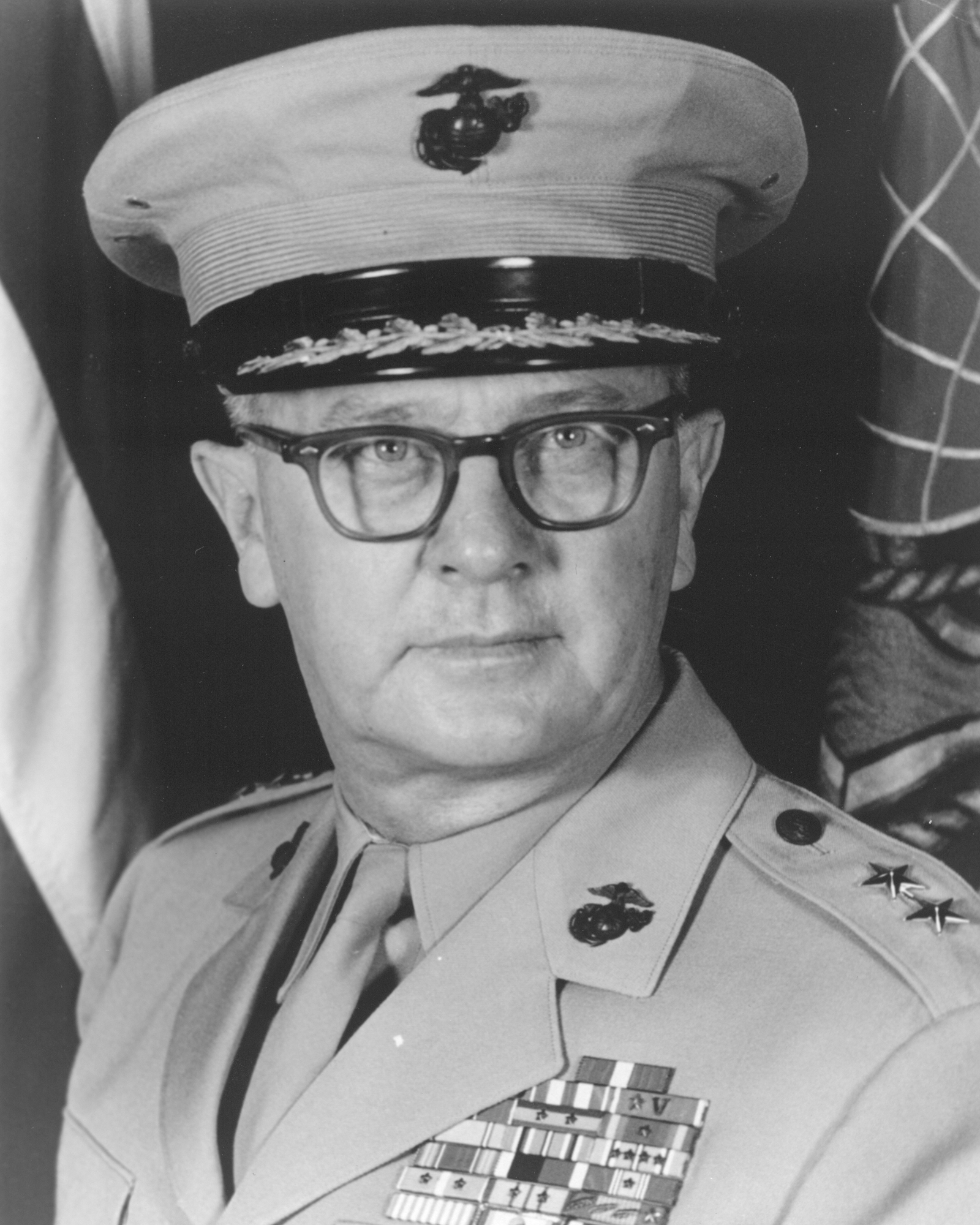
- MG Oscar F. Peatross, USMC
- Born: March 2, 1916; Raleigh, North Carolina, U.S.
- Died: May 26, 1993 (aged 77); Beaufort, South Carolina, U.S.
- Burial place: Beaufort, South Carolina
- Military career
- Allegiance: United States of America
- Branch: United States Marine Corps
- Service years: 1940–1971
- Rank: Major general
- Nickname: "Pete"
- Service number: 0-7196
- Commands: MCRD Parris Island; 7th Marine Regiment; 2nd Battalion, 5th Marines
- Conflicts: World War II; Makin Island raid; Carlson's patrol; Battle of Guadalcanal; Bougainville Campaign; Battle of Iwo Jima; Korean War; Vietnam War; Operation Starlite; Operation Piranha; Operation Utah; Operation Texas
- Awards: Navy Cross; Distinguished Service Medal; Silver Star; Legion of Merit (3); Bronze Star Medal

Oscar Franklin Peatross (March 2, 1916 – May 26, 1993) was a highly decorated officer of the United States Marine Corps with the rank of major general who served as Marine Raider in World War II and was awarded the Navy Cross for extraordinary heroism on August 17–18, 1942. He also served in the Korean War and the Vietnam War.

In 1993, the parade deck at the Marine Corps Recruit Depot Parris Island was named for Peatross.

== Early career ==
Peatross was born on March 2, 1916, in Raleigh, North Carolina, and graduated from Needham B. Broughton High School in 1934. He later graduated from North Carolina State College with a Bachelor of Science degree in 1939. Peatross joined the Marine Corps on November 6, 1940, and due to his university degree he was selected for the Officer's Candidate School at Marine Corps Base Quantico, Virginia.

He completed the school on February 20, 1941, and was commissioned a second lieutenant on that date. Peatross was then ordered to San Diego, California, and assigned to the newly activated 2nd Marine Division under Major General Clayton B. Vogel. He volunteered for the 2nd Marine Raider Battalion when the Marine Raiders units were formed in February 1942 and took part in the intensive training at Camp Elliott under famous lieutenant colonel Evans F. Carlson.

The Second Marine Raiders sailed for Hawaii in May 1942 for advanced instruction in rubber boat operations and landings from submarines. Peatross was promoted to the rank of first lieutenant and appointed platoon commander with Company B. The 2nd Raider Battalion was subsequently ordered for Makin Island in the Gilbert Islands in order to destroy Japanese installations, take prisoners and gain intelligence. During the raid, he led a reinforced squad of a dozen Raiders in one of 18 rubber boats off one of two U.S. submarines, but did not receive word on a change of plan in the landing area. He led his 12 men onto the original planned landing site, while the other 17 boats landed on a different beach.

Peatross distinguished himself during that action on August 17–18 and received Navy Cross, the United States military's second-highest decoration awarded for valor in combat.

His official Navy Cross Citation reads:

The President of the United States of America takes pleasure in presenting the Navy Cross to Captain Oscar Franklin Peatross (MCSN: 0-7196), United States Marine Corps Reserve, for extraordinary heroism and conspicuous devotion to duty as a Platoon Commander of Company B, SECOND Marine Raider Battalion, during the Marine Raider Expedition against the Japanese-held island of Makin in the Gilbert Islands on 17 and 18 August 1942. When extremely rough seas forced his separation from the rest of the raiding party, Captain Peatross boldly landed his men behind the enemy lines and attacked a superior enemy force. Continuing to harass the enemy's rear, thereby creating confusion in their ranks, Captain Peatross' daring tactics caused one of the enemy's aerial bombing formations to bomb its own troops. In this forceful and courageous engagement he and his group killed or wounded fifteen Japanese. His resourcefulness, leadership and personal valor were in keeping with the highest traditions of the United States Naval Service.

The 2nd Raider battalion was then ordered to Espiritu Santo for rest and reequipment and Peatross was promoted to the rank of captain and appointed company commander. After few months of rest, they were ordered to Guadalcanal at the beginning of November 1942 in order to reinforce other Marine units fighting there since August. Peatross spent 30 days behind enemy lines within Carlson's patrol and returned to Espiritu Santo in February 1943. He also received Navy Presidential Unit Citation for unit's performance during Guadalcanal Campaign.

Following the formation of 2nd Marine Regiment in September 1943, Peatross was appointed regimental operations officer under Lieutenant Colonel Alan Shapley. He also held additional duty as regimental executive officer and sailed with the regiment to Bougainville and took part in the Occupation and Defense of Cape Torokina in November–December 1943.

Peatross was promoted to the rank of major at the beginning of 1944 and ordered back to the United States, where he attended the Command and Staff School at Quantico. He was then ordered to Camp Pendleton, California and attached to the 28th Marine Regiment under Colonel Harry B. Liversedge. Peatross assumed duty as Regimental Operations officer and took part in extensive amphibious training of the regiment. He sailed with his regiment as the part of 5th Marine Division under Major General Keller E. Rockey to Hawaii in October 1944 and after another four months of training, they headed for Iwo Jima.

In February 1945, he took part in the Battle of Iwo Jima, where he was the Regimental Operations Officer of the 28th Marines and also held temporary duty as executive officer of 3rd Battalion, 28th Marines. For his service on Iwo Jima, Peatross received the Bronze Star Medal with Combat "V" and also his second Navy Presidential Unit Citation.

== Korean War ==
Following Iwo Jima, 28th Marines sailed back for Hawaii in order to prepare for Invasion of Japan, but the surrender of the Empire at the beginning of September 1945 changed the plans. Haynes subsequently sailed to Japan with his regiment and took part in the occupation duties at Sasebo. The 28th Marines were ordered back to the United States for deactivation in December and Peatross returned to Quantico, Virginia as an instructor with the Tactical Section, The Basic School, for the next three years.

Peatross was transferred to Fort Knox, Kentucky in summer 1949 and served as the Amphibious Warfare Instructor at the United States Army Armor School. While in this capacity, he was promoted to the rank of lieutenant colonel on January 1, 1951.

During the Korean War, Peatross was transferred to Far East and appointed commander of the 2nd Battalion 5th Marines, 1st Marine Division in September 1952. He took part in the "Outpost War", when his battalion came under heavy enemy fire during the building and rebuilding of fortifications. He frequently toured the front-line positions to keep abreast of the construction operations and to familiarize himself with the tactical situation. During the period when the unit was in a reserve status, he constantly strived for greater combat efficiency through extensive training programs. Peatross was decorated with the Legion of Merit with Combat "V" for his service in Korea.

He was ordered back to the United States in February 1954 and assumed duties at Headquarters Marine Corps in Washington, D.C., as assistant head, Officer Procurement Branch, Personnel Department. Peatross served in this capacity for three years under Brigadier General Reginald H. Ridgeley Jr. and then assumed command of the 1st Recruit Training Battalion at the Marine Corps Recruit Depot Parris Island, South Carolina.

Peatross later served as the S-3 officer and executive officer of the Recruit Training Regiment there and following his promotion to colonel in July 1959, he was ordered to Quantico for the Senior Course at the Marine Corps Schools, Quantico. He graduated in June 1960 and commanded the school's Demonstration Troops until July 1963.

== Vietnam War ==
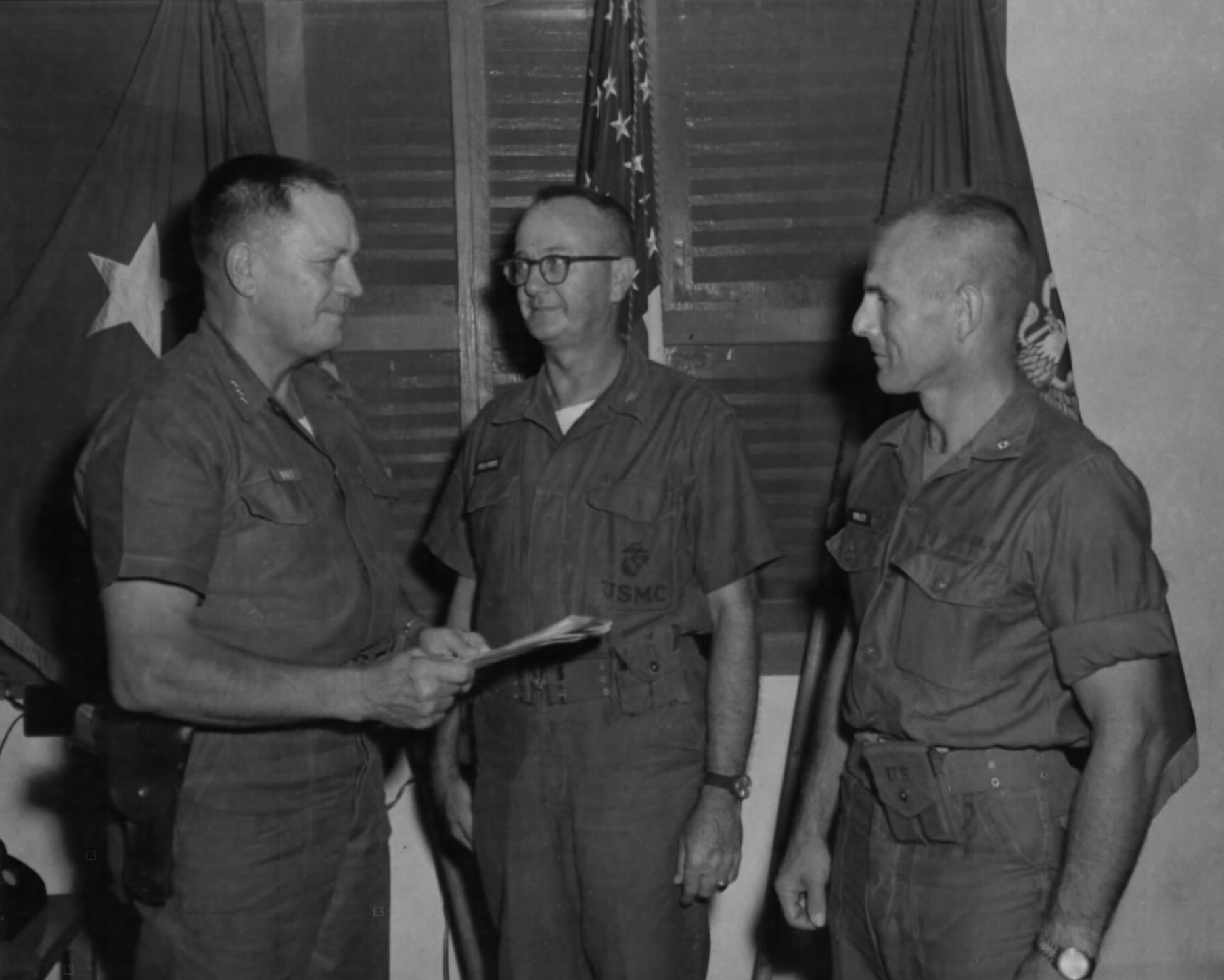
General Lewis W. Walt, Commanding General, III MAF, congratulates Colonel Oscar F. Peatross, Commanding Officer, 7th Marines, upon the awarding of the Navy Unit Commendation to the 7th Marines for the regiment's participation in Operation STARLITE. Lieutenant Colonel Charles R. Bodley, Commanding Officer, 3d Battalion, 7th Marines, looks on.

Peatross then served successively as Chief, Ground Combat Section, Landing Force Development Center, and as Chief, Publications Branch, Marine Corps Education Center, before joined the 1st Marine Division at Camp Pendleton, California. He served for several months as assistant chief of staff, G-4, and then as chief of staff of the III Marine Expeditionary Force during Exercise "Winter Night."

In March 1964, he became commanding officer of the 7th Marine Regiment. When the 7th Marines was redesignated as the 7th Regimental Landing Team, 3rd Marine Division, Colonel Peatross sailed with his unit to South Vietnam in 1965.

Peatross commanded his regiment during the Operation Starlite in August 1965, when the Viet Cong (VC) 1st Regiment had planned the attack on Chu Lai Base Area. He attacked the VC forces and repeatedly exposed himself to intense enemy fire, while commanding his regiment. Peatross deployed his command post in those positions from which he could personally direct the attack with disregard for the constant enemy small arms and mortar fire to which he was subjected. He was decorated with the Silver Star for gallantry in action and also received his third Presidential Unit Citation and second Navy Unit Commendation.

He later directed his regiment during Operation Piranha in September of that year, in which 7th Marines were tasked with the destruction of the VC 1st Regiment, which had withdrawn to the area of the Batangan Peninsula. During the operation, 7th Marine Regiment lost only two Marines and killed 178 enemy soldiers, capturing another 360. However the operational goal of the operation – destroying of VC 1st Regiment, failed and enemy had withdrawn from the area again.

Peatross later held additional duty as chief of staff, Task Force Delta under Brigadier General Jonas M. Platt and commanded his regiment during the Operations Utah and Texas. His tour of duty in Vietnam ended in April 1966, when he was recalled to the United States. For his service in Vietnam, Peatross received his second Legion of Merit and also was decorated with Vietnamese Gallantry Cross with Palm and Star.

Upon his return to the United States, Peatross reported to Headquarters Marine Corps, where he was appointed head, Training Branch, Operations Division (G-3) and following his promotion to the rank of brigadier general on November 3, 1966, he was appointed director, Management Analysis Group, Office of the chief of staff, Headquarters United States Marine Corps.

While in this capacity, Peatross distinguished himself and received his third Legion of Merit. His official citation reads:

The President of the United States of America takes pleasure in presenting a Second Gold Star in lieu of a Third Award of the Legion of Merit to Brigadier General Oscar Franklin Peatross (MCSN: 0-7196), United States Marine Corps, for exceptionally meritorious conduct in the performance of outstanding services to the Government of the United States as Director, Management Analysis Group, Office of the Chief of Staff, Headquarters United States Marine Corps, from 3 December 1966 to 18 October 1968. Through his ability as an highly competent and resourceful manager, General Peatross initiated numerous programs designed to strengthen management systems within the Marine Corps. Displaying outstanding leadership and professional skill, General Peatross developed the "Marine Corps Program Progress Report," a management discipline proving to be of invaluable assistance to the Commandant of the Marine Corps in his decision-making role. General Peatross headed the development of the program "Command and Management Presentation," a program presented to Marine Corps Officers, senior non-commissioned officers and key civilians to make them aware of management techniques created by the introduction of automated systems into the Marine Corps. He exhibited the Command and Management Presentation to every major Marine Corps Command in the United States, reaching over 26,000 key personnel. The presentation was also made to the Secretary of the Navy, selected Department of Defense and Department of the Navy personnel, to the Harvard University Advance Management Program, and the U.S. Naval Post Graduate School. General Peatross, recognizing the broadening of requirement for systems management throughout the Marine Corps and the lack of personnel possessing the technical skills of management analysis and data processing to manage these systems, sponsored the planning and provided the impetus required to provide eighteen Information System Design Sections, one in each major Marine Corps Command and Management Systems, while ensuring the preservation of human factors. By his outstanding leadership, sound judgment and inspiring devotion to the fulfillment of his responsibilities, General Peatross was an inspiration to all who served with him. His performance throughout this period upheld the highest traditions of the Marine Corps and of the United States Naval Service.

While stationed at Headquarters Marine Corps, General Peatross was ordered to Harvard University to attend the Advance Management Program, Graduate School of Business Administration, during September–December 1966.

He was promoted to the rank of major general on October 18, 1968, and ordered to Marine Corps Recruit Depot Parris Island, South Carolina one month later in order to succeed Major General Ormond R. Simpson as commanding general of that depot. Under his command, more than 90,000 young men and 2,300 young women were trained for service as United States Marines at the height of Vietnam War. Peatross remained in that capacity until the end of May 1971, at which time he officially retired after almost 31 years of active service. He was decorated with the Navy Distinguished Service Medal for his service at Parris Island.

== Later years and death ==
Major General Oscar F. Peatross died on May 26, 1993, after long illness in Beaufort, South Carolina, and was interred at Veterans National Cemetery, Beaufort, South Carolina.

== Quotes ==
"We find that the Marine Corps is made up of 99 percent Marines and 1 percent bullshitters. In peacetime, the bullshitters tend to be the ones you hear from. But I waded ashore on Guadalcanal in '42. I looked all the way down the beach to my right and all the way up the beach to my left. There wasn't a bullshitter in sight."

== Decorations ==
A complete list of the general's medals and decorations include:

1st Row	Navy Cross		Navy Distinguished Service Medal	Silver Star
2nd Row	Legion of Merit with Combat "V" with two 5/16" Gold Stars	Bronze Star Medal with Combat "V"	Navy Presidential Unit Citation with two stars	Navy Unit Commendation with one star
3rd Row	American Defense Service Medal	American Campaign Medal	Asiatic-Pacific Campaign Medal with four 3/16 inch service stars	World War II Victory Medal
4th Row	Navy Occupation Service Medal	National Defense Service Medal with one star	Korean Service Medal with two 3/16 inch bronze service stars	Vietnam Service Medal with two 3/16 inch bronze service stars
5th Row	Vietnam Gallantry Cross with Palm and star	United Nations Korea Medal	Republic of Korea Presidential Unit Citation	Vietnam Campaign Medal

Military offices
Preceded by Ormond R. Simpson	Commanding General of the Marine Corps Recruit Depot Parris Island; November 16, 1968 – May 28, 1971	Succeeded by Carl W. Hoffman

== See also ==
- List of historically notable United States Marines
