= Batangan Peninsula =

Peninsula in Quảng Ngãi Province, Vietnam

Coordinates: 15°13′10.6″N 108°54′47″E

The Ba Làng An Peninsula (Vietnamese: mũi Ba Làng An, lit. 'land nose of Three Villages called An') is a peninsula in Quảng Ngãi Province, Vietnam, northeast of Quảng Ngãi and 32 kilometres (20 mi) south of Chu Lai. The name was often mispronounced as "Ba Tang An" and known as Batangan during the Vietnam War, although Far Eastern Economic Review and other sources continue to refer to the "Ba Lang An peninsula".

== History ==
The "Three Villages called An" which give the name to the peninsula are Vân An, An Chuẩn, and An Hải. The term "ba làng" is native Vietnamese language for "three villages", while the three villages themselves have the usual Sino-Vietnamese names used by Confucian tax-collectors. The Sino-Vietnamese character "An" 安 means "peace", so the villages are sometimes called "Three Villages of Peace".

=== French Indochina ===
During the colonial period the waters off the peninsular were recognised as rich fishing grounds. In Nos richesses coloniales 1900–1905 (1906) the cape was called Cap Batangan in French. A French agricultural review (1935) commented that the land of the peninsula was relatively fertile.

The French Navy used Cape Batangan as the starting point for its ships assigned to supply the Paracel Islands, sailing straight East to West from the Cape to Pattle Island and 'Boisée' ('Wooded') islands where there were Vietnamese and French settlers, as well as weather observation stations.

=== The Vietnam War ===
Since 1963 the Vietcong (VC) converted the Peninsula into a fortified stronghold. Following the conclusion of Operation Starlite, on 24 August 1965, Marine intelligence concluded that the 1st VC Regiment had withdrawn into the Peninsula. Reconnaissance photos of the Peninsula showed a V of older field fortifications pointing inland with the open end to the sea and a new second V further inland under construction.

==== Operation Piranha ====
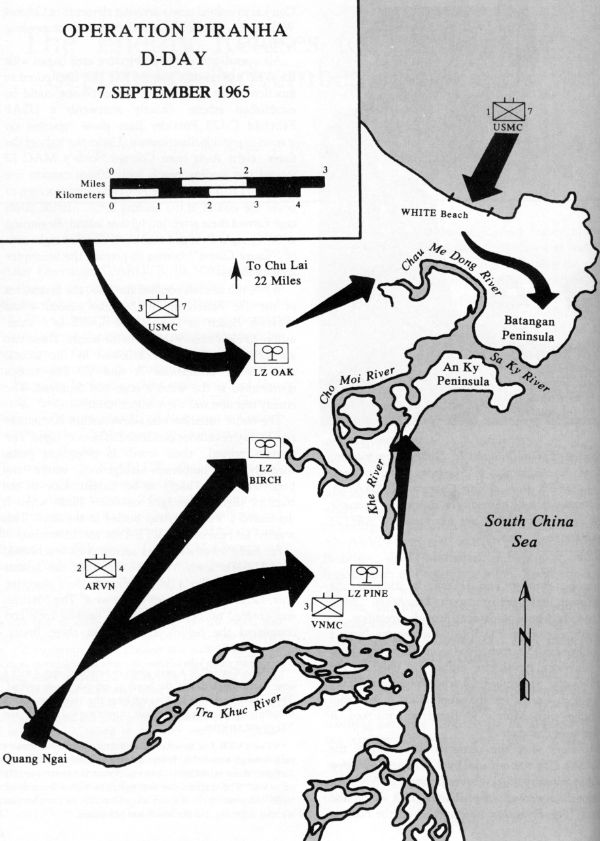
Map of Operation Piranha

The Marines, Army of the Republic of Vietnam and Vietnamese Marines conducted Operation Piranha on the peninsula on 7–10 September 1965. The operation resulted in US claims of 178 VC killed and 360 VC and suspected VC had been captured. Allied losses were two Marines and five South Vietnamese killed. An unknown number may have been civilians, due to the declaration of a free-fire zone.

The Peninsula later became part of the Tactical Area of Responsibility of the Korean 2nd Marine Brigade in 1966 and then the Americal Division, however despite periodic operations the area remained a VC stronghold. The village of My Lai, scene of the My Lai massacre, is situated 5 km southwest of the Peninsula.

==== Operations Bold Mariner and Russell Beach ====
The Marines conducted Operation Bold Mariner on the peninsula from 13 January to 7 February 1969. The Marine assault linked up with Operation Russell Beach conducted by the Americal Division's Task Force Cooksey, composed of elements of the 46th Infantry Regiment and 1st Cavalry Regiment and the ARVN 2nd Division to seal off the southern boundary. Due to constant US bombardment, civilians had lived primarily in bunkers and caves in the region. The Marines evacuated numerous civilians for screening, eventually totaling some 11,900 people. Following the conclusion of the assault phase, Operation Russell Beach continued with Marine combined action teams, the 46th Infantry Regiment and the ARVN 6th Regiment operating to cleanse the peninsula of VC and People's Army of Vietnam forces. The population was largely removed from the peninsula during the assault phase and a clear and search operation was followed by the construction of new roads and hamlets. The population was allowed to return in April 1969 together with South Vietnamese government institutions VC losses in Operation Russell Beach were 158 killed and 116 suspects detained and 55 individual and six crew-served weapons captured. U.S. losses were 56 killed.

In March 1970, a patrol from the 1st Battalion, 6th Infantry Regiment walked into a minefield on the Peninsula. By his own account, the battalion commander, Lt Col Norman Schwarzkopf Jr., flew there in his command helicopter and walked into the minefield to rescue a wounded soldier.

==== Allegations ====
North Vietnamese sources (1969) made allegations of American use of gas against civilians during mopping up operations. These were discussed in the French Senate in 1969.

==== Easter Offensive ====
During the Easter Offensive of 1972 in late April the VC 48th Battalion was reported to have destroyed 23 villages around the Batangan Peninsula, killing 23 civilians and making a further 30,000 homeless in an attempt to disrupt South Vietnamese pacification efforts. Among the villages destroyed were two housing survivors of the Mỹ Lai massacre.

== Agriculture and tourism ==
The Ba Làng An Peninsula is a rich and productive agricultural region encompassing approximately 48 square km of flat, fertile farmland and rolling hills. Today the beaches of the cape are a centre for tourism and diving.
