= Operation Texas (Vietnam War) =

Part of the Vietnam War (1966)

- Part of the Vietnam War
Date	20–25 March 1966
Location	Quảng Ngãi Province, South Vietnam 15.19°N 108.67°E
Result	U.S./ARVN claim victory

Belligerents
United States; South Vietnam	Viet Cong; North Vietnam

Commanders and leaders
(United States) Oscar Peatross (United States) Lowell English (South Vietnam) Hoàng Xuân Lãm	

Units involved
(United States) 1st Marine Division; 3/7th Marines; 2/4th Marines; 3/5th Marines; (South Vietnam) 2nd Infantry Division; 2/5th Infantry; 3/5th Infantry; (South Vietnam) Airborne Division; 5th Battalion	(Vietnam) 2nd Infantry Division: 1st Regiment; 21st Regiment

Casualties and losses
(United States) 99 killed	283 killed

Operation Texas was a US Marine Corps and Army of the Republic of Vietnam (ARVN) operation that took place northwest of Quảng Ngãi, lasting from 20 to 25 March 1966.

== Prelude ==
On the night of 18/19 March the Vietcong 1st Regiment overran the ARVN 936th Regional Force Company outpost at Hill 141 northwest of Quảng Ngãi, the ARVN 2nd Infantry Division commander General Lãm decided to send a reaction force to retake the outpost. The 120 man ARVN force collected from Quảng Ngãi by helicopters from HMM-261, but as they approached the outpost they were met with heavy machine gun fire damaging 8 of 10 helicopters and only 3 helicopters were able to land to offload their troops. Given the heavy fire encountered the decision was made to abort the operation and while Marine jets bombed the outpost, the helicopters returned to evacuate the ARVN troops. General Lãm then approached the 3rd Marine Division commander General Wood B. Kyle to mount a joint operation to retake the outpost. On 19 March General Lãm and Colonel Oscar F. Peatross planned an operation similar to the recently concluded Operation Utah. The plan called for the 3rd Battalion 7th Marines and the ARVN 5th Airborne Battalion to be deployed by helicopters, 4 km west of Hill 141 and advance east in 2 columns to retake the Hill.

== Operation ==
=== 20 March ===
On the morning of 20 March after preparatory air and artillery strikes, helicopters from Marine Aircraft Group 36 landed the Marine and ARVN units at the landing zone west of Hill 141 and began moving east. Company I 3/7 Marines was landed on Hill 141 where they found the bodies of 31 of the defenders.

In the afternoon, Colonel Paul X. Kelley, commander of the 2nd Battalion 4th Marines, one of the operation's reserve units visited the 7th Marines command post and suggested that the Vietcong may have moved east from Hill 141 towards the coast and it was decided that this area should be searched.

=== 21 March ===
On the morning of 21 March 3/7 Marines moved southeast from Hill 141, 2/4 Marines was landed by helicopter southeast near the hamlet of Phuoc Dinh (2), while the ARVN 2nd Battalion 5th Regiment and an APC Company advanced southwest from Binh Son and the 3rd Battalion 5th Regiment advanced northwest from the direction of Quảng Ngãi.

The helicopters carrying 2/4 Marines were met with heavy machine gun fire and Company F, the first to land had to repulse Vietcong attacks on the landing zone. Artillery fire was called in on Phuoc Dinh (2) and at 12:30 2/4 Marines began their attack on the village with Company D attacking from the north and Companies E and F attacking east. As the Marines began their assault on the village helicopter gunships from VMO-6 saw numerous Vietcong moving within defensive positions and the Marines were met by intense small arms fire. Company E penetrated the first layer of defenses but soon discovered 3 more lines of bunkers and barbed wire, while Company D was unable to penantrate the defenses. The 2/4 Marine command group was caught in a crossfire which killed or wounded 14 Marines and COL Kelley called for napalm strikes immediately in front of his positions. By 16:00 51 airstrikes and 1346 artillery rounds had been directed against the Vietcong positions and 2/4 Marines were able to disengage.

Approximately 2 km north of Phuoc Dinh (2), 3/7 Marines encountered an estimated 2 Companies of Vietcong in bunker positions, after a 3-hour battle the Vietcong broke contact.

At 16:00 the operational reserve 3rd Battalion 1st Marines and the ARVN 2nd Division Strike Company were deployed by helicopter to Xuan Hoa hamlet 1.5 km southeast of Phuoc Dinh (2). As they approached the landing zone a UH-34 from HMM-163 was hit by machine gun fire and crashed killing 7 Marines and 3 crew. As they approached Xuan Hoa the force encountered well entrenched Vietcong who engaged them until nightfall when they slipped away.

North of Phuoc Dinh (2), the ARVN 5th Airborne and APC Company encountered a Vietcong Battalion near the hamlet of Khanh My (3), the Vietcong repulsed two ARVN attacks immobilising 9 M113s.

=== 22 March ===
Brigadier General Lowell English assumed command of the Marine forces, now renamed Task Force Delta. The Marines and ARVN resumed their attack at dawn but encountered little opposition as the Vietcong had slipped away during the night. The bodies of 168 Vietcong dead were found in Phuoc Dinh (2). BG English decided to extend the operation towards the south.

=== 23 March ===
In the afternoon 3/7 Marines was lifted by helicopter 9 km south to Phuoc Loc village. As the Marines advanced on the village they were met by well-entrenched Vietcong in a battle that lasted until nightfall. The Marines called in supporting fire and over 2000 artillery rounds were dropped on the village.

=== 24 March ===
In the morning 3/7 Marines secured the village, the Vietcong had once again slipped away during the night using an extensive tunnel network. The Marines had lost 7 dead and 56 wounded while Vietcong losses were estimated at 60 dead. Northeast of Phuoc Loc the ARVN engaged a Vietcong force killing 40.

== Aftermath ==
Operation Texas concluded on 25 March, the Marines had suffered 99 dead and 212 wounded and claiming that the Vietcong had 283 killed. Casualties for the ARVN are unknown.

On 28 March the ARVN 3rd Battalion 5th Regiment was attacked 1.5 km east of Phuoc Loc village. The Marines launched Operation Indiana deploying the 1st Battalion 7th Marines by helicopter to support the ARVN and encountered an estimated Vietcong Battalion near the hamlet of Vinh Loc (2). The Marines renewed their assault on Vinh Loc (2) the next day supported by 2nd Battalion 7th Marines but the Vietcong had abandoned the village during the night leaving 69 dead, while the ARVN claimed to have killed a further 100. Marine losses were 11 dead and 45 wounded.
