= Operation Piranha =

Part of the Vietnam War (1965)

- Part of the Vietnam War
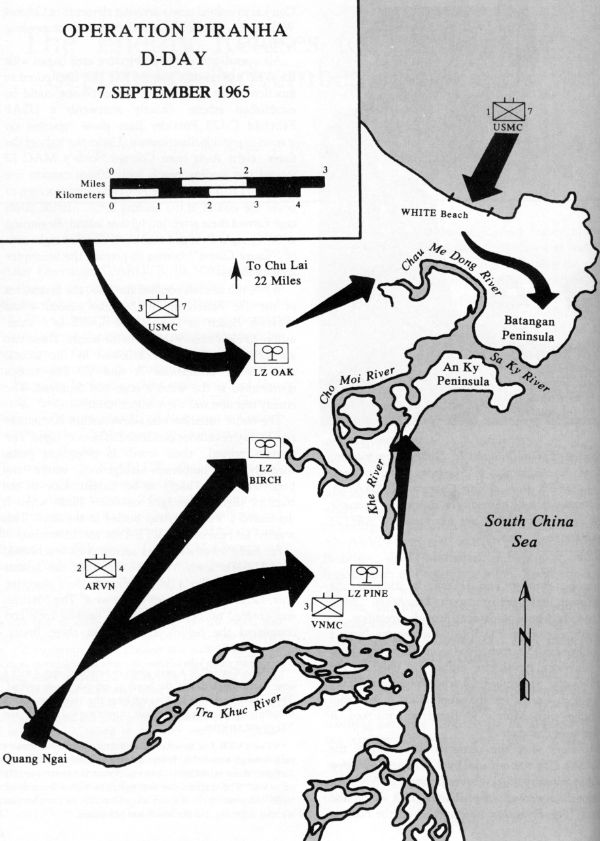
- Map of Operation Piranha
Date	7–10 September 1965
Location	Batangan Peninsula, Quảng Ngãi Province, South Vietnam 15.219°N 108.913°E
Result	Inconclusive

Belligerents
South Vietnam; United States	Viet Cong

Commanders and leaders
Col. Oscar F. Peatross	

Units involved
South Vietnam: 2nd Battalion, 4th Regiment; 3rd Vietnamese Marine Battalion; United States: 1st Battalion, 7th Marines; 3rd Battalion, 7th Marines	1st Regiment

Casualties and losses
(South Vietnam) 5 killed (United States) 2 killed	178 killed 360 prisoners and suspects captured

Operation Piranha was a US Marine Corps operation during the Vietnam War that took place on the Batangan Peninsula from 7 to 10 September 1965.

== Prelude ==
Following the conclusion of Operation Starlite, on 24 August 1965, Marine intelligence concluded that the 1st VC Regiment had withdrawn into the Batangan Peninsula. Reconnaissance photos of the Peninsula showed a V of older field fortifications pointing inland with the open end to the sea and a new second V further inland under construction.

The plan of operations was for a Battalion Landing Team (BLT) of the 1st Battalion, 7th Marines to land across White Beach north of the Peninsula and push south, while 3rd Battalion, 7th Marines, would be helilifted in by MAG-16 to set up blocking positions 4 km inland. 3rd Battalion, 3rd Marines would remain available as a floating reserve. The Army of the Republic of Vietnam (ARVN) 2nd Battalion, 4th Regiment and the 3rd Vietnamese Marine Battalion would be helilifted into the south of 3/7 Marines to clear and search the An Ky Peninsula.

== Operation ==
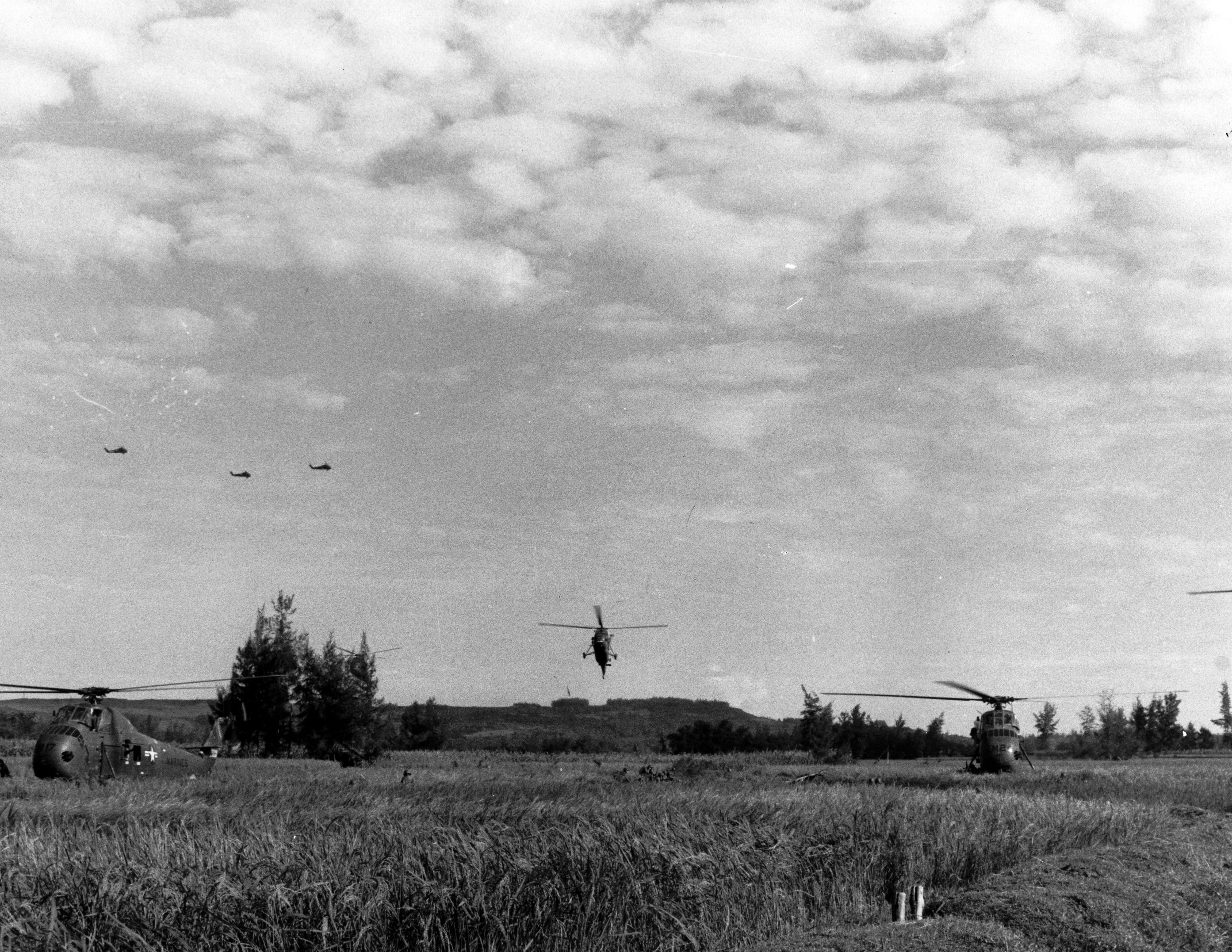
HMM-261 UH-34s land the ARVN 2nd Battalion, 4th Regiment at LZ Pine

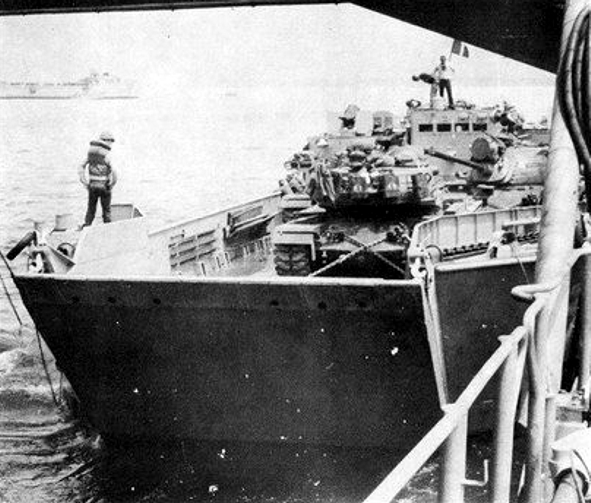
An LCU loaded with M48s leaves USS Belle Grove

The operation was launched on 7 September 1965, the amphibious landing was unopposed, while the landing of the ARVN force received some minor ground fire.

On 8 September, Company B 1/7 Marines discovered a VC field hospital in a large cave near the center of the Peninsula. The Marines captured four prisoners, but then came under fire from other VC in the cave. The Marines returned the fire and attempted to convince the VC to surrender. Marine engineers then placed explosives in the cave. After the detonation, the Marines counted 66 VC dead inside.

== Aftermath ==
Operation Piranha concluded on 10 September, the US claimed that 178 VC had been killed and 360 VC and suspected VC had been captured. Allied losses were two Marines and five South Vietnamese killed.

The operation failed to wipe out the 1st VC Regiment, villagers told the Marines that Vietcong units had been in the area but had left, some less than 24 hours before Operation Piranha had commenced. Intelligence reports later indicated that the 1st VC Regiment began leaving the peninsula on 4 September, coinciding with the increased movement of the amphibious ships at Chu Lai Base Area.
