= Hội An Base Camp =

Site information
- Type: Army
- Condition: abandoned

Location
- Coordinates: 15°53′20″N 108°19′05″E

Site history
- Built: 1968
- In use: 1968-75
- Battles/wars: Vietnam War

Garrison information
- Occupants: 2nd Marine Division (Republic of Korea)

Hội An Airfield
- IATA: none; ICAO: none

Summary
- Elevation AMSL: 10 ft (3.0 m)
- Interactive map of Hội An Airfield

Runways
Direction	Length		Surface
Direction	ft	m	Surface
	1,900	579	PSP

Hội An Base Camp was a Republic of Korea Marine Corps (ROKMC) and Army of the Republic of Vietnam (ARVN) base located in Hội An in central Vietnam.

== History ==
The base was located just north of the old town of Hội An and 22 km southeast of Danang.

The base was constructed by the 58th Naval Construction Battalion starting on 1 March 1968 in what was the largest single Seabee construction mission of the Vietnam War. When construction was completed on 21 June 1968 the base complex comprised over 1300 structures and was capable of accommodating over 8000 men.

The 3rd Battalion, 21st Infantry was based here from June–July 1968

== Current use ==
The base has been largely turned over to housing and a large Vietcong/PAVN cemetery.
