= Howard H. Cooksey =

United States Army general

Howard Harrison Cooksey
- Born: June 21, 1921; Brentsville, Virginia
- Died: December 22, 1999 (aged 78); Fort Belvoir
- Burial place: Arlington National Cemetery
- Military career
- Allegiance: United States of America
- Branch: United States Army
- Service years: 1938–1978
- Rank: Lieutenant General
- Conflicts: World War II; Korean War; Vietnam War
- Awards: Distinguished Service Medal; Silver Star; Legion of Merit; Bronze Star

Howard Harrison Cooksey (1921–1999) was a United States Army Lieutenant General who served as deputy commander of the 23rd Infantry Division during the Vietnam War.

== Early life and education ==
Cooksey was born in Brentsville, Virginia and grew up in Manassas. He attended Virginia Tech, graduating in 1943.

== Military service ==
=== World War II ===
He served with the 158th Regimental Combat Team.

=== Korean War ===
He served in the 7th Infantry Division.

=== Post Korean War ===
In 1961, he served with 2nd Battle Group, 6th Infantry Regiment, part of the Berlin Brigade.

In 1964, he obtained a master's degree in Foreign Affairs from George Washington University.

In 1968, he was the commanding officer of Fort Dix before receiving orders to locate to South Vietnam in June 1968.

=== Vietnam War ===
He served as deputy commander of the 23rd Infantry Division from 12 June 1968 to 1 May 1969.

In June 1972, Cooksey took over MG Frederick Kroesen's role as senior U.S. military adviser in I Corps and assumed responsibility for supporting the South Vietnamese forces in undoing the North Vietnamese gains in the Easter Offensive.

=== Post Vietnam ===
He served as deputy chief of staff for research, development and acquisition until his retirement from the Army in 1978.

== Later life ==
After his retirement he established a military consulting firm in Alexandria, Virginia. He worked as a consultant for Ford Aerospace when they were competing for the award of the Division Air Defense gun system. The contract was awarded to Ford on 7 May 1981. It was later suggested that Ford had acted improperly in engaging consultants such as Cooksey who had only recently retired from key equipment decision-making roles in the Army and an investigation was launched by Undersecretary of the Army, James R. Ambrose, a former Ford Aerospace executive.

He died of heart disease on 22 December 1999 at Fort Belvoir and was buried at Arlington National Cemetery.
