= Operation Quyet Thang 202 =

Part of the Vietnam War (1964)

Operation Sure Win 202
- Part of the Vietnam War
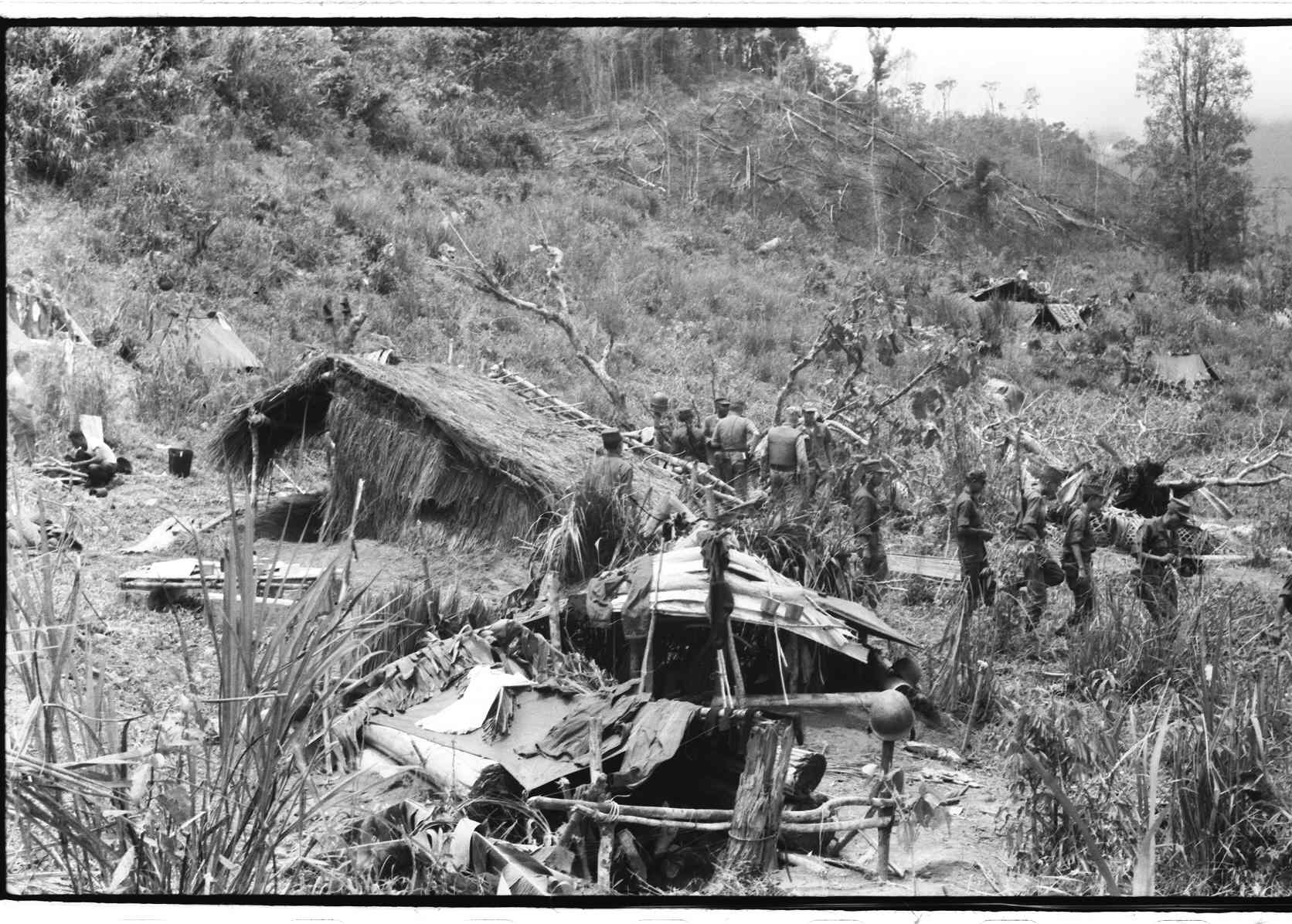
- VC gun emplacements at Do Xa
Date	27 April – 27 May 1964
Location	Quang Ngai-Kontum
Result	South Vietnamese victory

Belligerents
South Vietnam	Viet Cong

Commanders and leaders
Do Cao Tri	Nguyen Don

Strength
5,000	1,000

Casualties and losses
22 killed 6 aircraft destroyed	53 killed 6 captured

Operation Sure Win 202 (Vietnamese : Chiến dịch Quyết Thắng 202) was a 1964 Army of the Republic of Vietnam (ARVN) operation carried out with US support. ARVN commandos were transported by U.S. helicopters behind entrenched Viet Cong (VC) positions, attacking them with shoulder fired rockets and flame throwers. Sniper teams then tracked the fleeing rebels and engaged them.

== Background ==
General Do Cao Tri's plan for the operation contained several phases. In the first, three Vietnamese Special Forces teams would infiltrate the area to reconnoiter and to direct air strikes. After about two weeks, the main operation would begin, employing three independent battle groups that would spend a month scouring the secret base. The force would total 5,000 soldiers, including one airborne, two ranger, and five infantry battalions, plus three airborne ranger companies from the Vietnamese 77th Special Forces Group. Six United States Army helicopter companies and the United States Marine Corps HMM-364 helicopter squadron would support the operation. Once the main operation terminated, Vietnamese Special Forces would stay for up to six months to harass VC forces during their expected return to the region. Tri took elaborate precautions to keep the plan secret and to confuse the VC with deception actions. These measures failed to fool the VC, as prisoners later revealed that they had received several days’ warning. The secrecy succeeded, however, in complicating the ARVN's own preparations, as troop commanders received just 48 hours' notice before deployment.

On 26 April ARVN and US Army and Marine Corps officers met in Pleiku to plan a helicopter assault on the VC Do Xa stronghold (15.177°N 108.078°E) on the northern border of II Corps. The operational plan called for HMM-364 to lift an ARVN battalion from Quảng Ngãi Airfield to Landing Zone Bravo 30 miles (48 km) to the west, simultaneously a US Army helicopter company based at Pleiku would transport two ARVN battalions from Gi Lang to a second landing zone 8 miles (13 km) southwest of LZ Bravo.

== Operation ==
On the morning of 27 April Republic of Vietnam Air Force (RVNAF) A-1 Skyraiders conducted preparatory airstrikes on the two landing zones. US Army UH-1B helicopter gunships commanded by Captain John W. Woodmansee, then conducted a reconnaissance of the landing zones and were met by VC machine gun fire at LZ Bravo. The UH-1Bs engaged the machine guns until they ran out of munitions and returned to base to refuel and rearm and further airstrikes were called in. One A-1 was hit by 0.51 cal machine gun fire and crashed 1 mile (1.6 km) from Quảng Ngãi Airfield. The airstrikes continued until 12:25 when the transport helicopters began their landing, but the VC remained active around LZ Bravo hitting many of the UH-34Ds, forcing one to crash-land in the LZ. The second wave was delayed to allow further airstrikes and only resumed at 13:55, but the VC continued to fire on the LZ and approaching helicopters hitting one RVNAF UH-34 and forcing it to crash-land. With more ARVN forces now on the ground they were able to push back to VC machine-gunners from LZ Bravo, however the VC had hit 15 of the 19 Marine helicopters and only 11 Marine and RVNAF helicopters remained airworthy at the end of the day.

Further west, the 52nd Aviation Battalion was delivering two South Vietnamese ranger battalions. Landing Zone Alpha was also unfavorable, a valley wide enough for just two UH–1Bs to land at a time under the watchful eyes of VC gunners perched in the hills above. In addition to VC resistance, a fratricide incident occurred, when an Army gunship mistakenly opened fire on South Vietnamese troops, killing 14 and wounding 21.

On the morning of 28 April HMM-364 landed the last ARVN forces at LZ Bravo. Later that day an HMM-364 UH-34 was caught in rotor wash while landing at Quảng Ngãi Airfield and crashed into a canal being totally written off. On 29 April an aircraft recovery team flew to LZ Bravo to assess the two shot down UH-34s, however both were deemed beyond repair and were destroyed.

On 30 April, I Corps unleashed the operation’s third battle group in southern Quang Tin Province. On 14 May antiaircraft fire hit every helicopter ferrying in battalions that would try to extract two other battalions allegedly trapped in a narrow valley. The pilots repeatedly asked for napalm, but South Vietnamese authorities, reacting to adverse publicity over the fact that Allied aircraft had recently used napalm to burn several villages elsewhere in the country, refused permission.

On 27 May, the regular ARVN units withdrew, ending the main phase of the operation. Phase 3 began immediately thereafter, but in a truncated form. Rather than keep Vietnamese Special Forces in the Do Xa region to harass the VC for another six months, Tri decided to withdraw them after just two weeks.

== Aftermath ==
If the incursion into the Do Xa base temporarily discomfited the VC, its results were limited. The Allies had killed just 53 VC, wounded six, captured six, and took in a Hoi Chanh. The price had been one plane and five helicopters destroyed, 22 South Vietnamese killed, and another 91 wounded along with two wounded Americans.
