= Charles M. Gettys =

United States Army general

Charles Martin Gettys
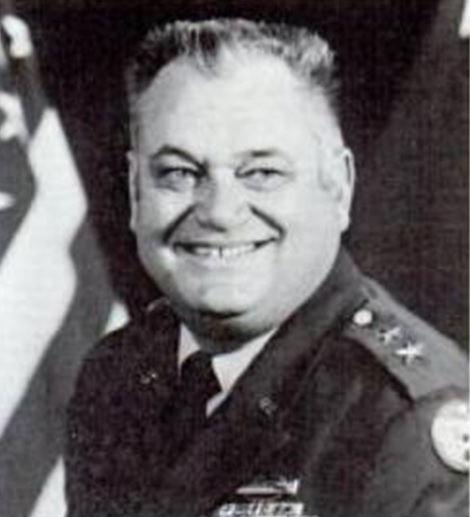
- Gettys as a major general commanding U.S. Army Alaska in 1972
- Born: January 1, 1915; Charlotte, North Carolina, U.S.
- Died: November 20, 1982 (aged 67); Walter Reed Army Medical Center
- Burial place: Arlington National Cemetery
- Military career
- Allegiance: United States of America
- Branch: United States Army
- Service years: 1938–1973
- Rank: Major General
- Commands: 23rd Infantry Division
- Conflicts: World War II; Vietnam War
- Awards: Distinguished Service Medal 3 Silver Star 2 Legion of Merit 3 Bronze Star

Charles Martin Gettys (January 1, 1915 – November 20, 1982) was a United States Army Major General who served as commander of the 23rd Infantry Division (Americal Division) during the Vietnam War.

== Early life and education ==
Gettys was born in Charlotte, North Carolina, and grew up in Rock Hill, South Carolina. He attended Clemson University graduating in 1936.

== Military service ==
He received a commission in the Army Reserve and was called to active duty in 1940.

Following his World War II service, he attended the University of Michigan and then went to Ecuador as the infantry adviser on the U.S. military mission there.

He was later assigned to the Command and General Staff College, from which he graduated, and airborne training.

His foreign postings included Korea, Italy and Germany.

=== Post WWII ===
He was promoted to Brigadier General on 1 July 1965.

He served at the Joint Chiefs of Staff from 1966 to 1967 as Deputy Director J-3 (Operations) and then from 1967 to 1968 as Deputy Special Assistant for Strategic Mobility.

He was promoted to Major General on 1 August 1968.

He served as Director of Individual Training (Office of Army Deputy Chief of Staff Personnel) from 1969 to 1970.

=== Vietnam War ===
He served as Commanding General, 23rd Infantry Division (Americal Division) from 23 June 1968 to June 1969.

In November 1968 Gettys' command and control UH-1 helicopter crashed after which he was pulled from the wreckage by his assistant chief of staff for operations, Major Colin Powell, for which he was awarded the Soldier's Medal.

Gettys returned to South Vietnam in 1970 and served as Chief of Staff for Military Assistance Command, Vietnam until 1971.

=== Post Vietnam ===
He served as commander U.S. Army Alaska from 1971 until his retirement in 1973. In 1973 Gettys despatched 13 soldiers of the 172nd Arctic Light Infantry Brigade on 10 Ski-Doo snowmobiles to ostensibly "test the long-range travel reliability of snowmobiles for their usefulness in Arctic warfare" and led to the establishment of a trail from Skwentna which would be the route of the inaugural Iditarod Trail Sled Dog Race.

== Later life ==
He died of cancer on November 20, 1982, at the Walter Reed Army Medical Center and was buried at Arlington National Cemetery.
