= Tiên Phước =

- Interactive map of Tiên Phước
- Coordinates: 15.488273034078027°N 108.30806956047057°E
- Country: Vietnam
- Region: South Central Coast and Central Highlands
- Municipality: Da Nang
- Administrative headquarters: 81 Huỳnh Thúc Kháng Street

Area
  - Total: 74.63 km^{2} (28.81 sq mi)

Population (2025)
  - Total: 28,137
  - Density: 377/km^{2} (980/sq mi)
- Website: tienphuoc.danang.gov.vn

Tiên Phước is a commune in the municipality of Da Nang, Vietnam.

On 16 June 2025:

- District-level administrative units nationwide were dissolved.
- The entire area and population of Tiên Kỳ township and the communes of Tiên Mỹ, Tiên Phong, and Tiên Thọ, formerly part of Tiên Phước district in the former Quảng Nam province, were merged to form a new commune named Tiên Phước.
