= Operation Harvest Moon =

Part of the Vietnam War (1965)

- Part of Vietnam War
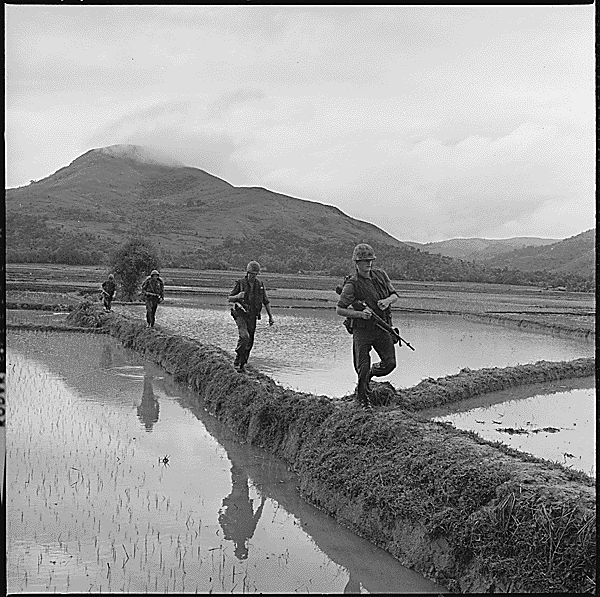
- 2nd Battalion, 7th Marines move across paddy dikes during Operation Harvest Moon
Date	8–20 December 1965
Location	Quế Sơn Valley, Quảng Tín Province (now Quang Nam Province), South Vietnam

Belligerents
United States; South Vietnam	Viet Cong

Commanders and leaders
(United States) LG Lew Walt; BG Melvin D. Henderson; BG Jonas M. Platt (South Vietnam) Gen. Nguyễn Chánh Thi; BG Hoàng Xuân Lãm	Unknown

Units involved
(United States) 3rd Battalion, 3rd Marines; 2nd Battalion, 7th Marines; 2nd Battalion, 1st Marines; 2nd Battalion, 9th Marines (South Vietnam) 3rd Battalion, 1st Regiment; 1st Battalion, 5th Regiment; 1st Battalion, 6th Regiment; 11th Ranger Battalion	1st Regiment

Casualties and losses
(South Vietnam) 90 killed 91 missing (United States) 45 killed	407 killed 33 captured

Operation Harvest Moon/Lien Ket 18 was a US Marine Corps and Army of the Republic of Vietnam search and destroy operation in the Quế Sơn Valley in western Quảng Tín Province, lasting from 8 to 20 December 1965.

== Background ==
On the evening of 17 November 1965 the Viet Cong (VC) 1st Regiment overran the Regional Force garrison defending the district capital of Hiệp Đức at the mouth of the Quế Sơn Valley. On the morning of 18 November as helicopters from Marine Aircraft Group 16 and Marine Aircraft Group 36 began landing two ARVN battalions on a landing zone 700m southwest of Hiệp Đức, they were hit by antiaircraft fire from VC 12.7mm machine guns in the adjacent hills which hit 17 out of 30 UH-34s and killed 1 Marine crewman. The helicopter landings were suspended while F-4Bs from Marine Aircraft Group 11 and A-4s from Marine Aircraft Group 12 attacked the antiaircraft positions. The helicopter landings were resumed and the ARVN repulsed an attack on the landing zone. By 19 November the ARVN had recaptured Hiệp Đức, killing 141 VC and capturing 87 weapons while losing 33 killed.

On 20 November the 2 ARVN battalions were withdrawn from Hiệp Đức to support a counterattack against a People's Army of Vietnam (PAVN) attack on Thach Tru in southern I Corps.

On 4 December III Marine Amphibious Force (III MAF) commander LG Lew Walt met with ARVN I Corps commander Gen. Nguyễn Chánh Thi to discuss the worsening security situation in the Quế Sơn Valley and they agreed to mount a joint operation there to neutralize the VC forces.

On 5 December III MAF activated Task Force Delta commanded by 3rd Marine Division deputy commander BG Melvin D. Henderson to control the operation and the 3rd Battalion, 3rd Marines, the 2nd Battalion, 7th Marines and a provisional artillery battalion formed from the 11th and 12th Marine Regiments were assigned to Task Force Delta. By 7 December BG Henderson and his ARVN counterpart BG Hoàng Xuân Lãm commander of the 2nd Division, had completed planning the operation which called for the ARVN 5th Regiment comprising the 1st Battalion and the 11th Ranger Battalion to advance along Route 534 from Thăng Bình to Hiệp Đức on 8 December and then on 9 December the 2/7 Marines would be landed by helicopter southwest of Quế Sơn where the VC 1st Regiment was suspected to be operating and force them eastwards towards the ARVN force.

== Operation ==
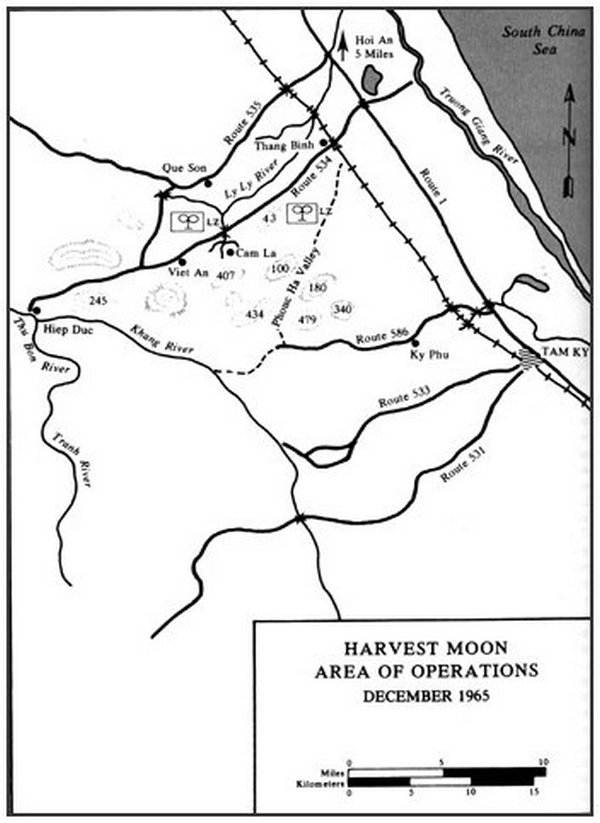
Map of Operation Harvest Moon

On the morning of 8 December the ARVN began their advance along Route 534 with the 1st Battalion on the left of the road and the 11th Rangers on the right. At 13:30 the Rangers walked into an ambush by the VC 70th Battalion which was overrun within 15 minutes, losing a third of their men, the remainder withdrew and established a defensive perimeter 1.2 km northwest and called for air support. The ARVN 1st Regiment was prevented from reinforcing the Rangers by intensive small arms and mortar fire and MAG-12 A-4s hit the VC positions. Later that day HMM-161 helicopters flew in the ARVN 6th Infantry Regiment from Tam Kỳ to replace the 11th Rangers.

At 06:45 on 9 December the VC 60th and 80th Battalions hit the ARVN 1st Battalion position, overrunning the Battalion and 5th Regiment command posts and killing the 5th Regiment commander and scattering the remaining ARVN forces. The VC launched a simultaneous assault on the 6th Regiment position to the north which was repulsed. At 10:00 HMM-161 and HMM-361 helicopters began landing the 2/7 Marines 9 km west of the ARVN position and they moved northeast, establishing a defensive position 2.5 km from their landing zone by late afternoon. At 14:00 HMM-261 began landing the 3/3 Marines 2.5 km southeast of the ARVN 1st Battalion and by 15:30 they had made contact with the ARVN. As the 3/3 Marines continued advancing northwest towards Hill 43 they encountered a force of approximately 200 VC in a fight that continued until dusk when the VC withdrew. The Marines estimated that they killed over 75 VC, while losing 11 Marines.

On 10 December the 2/7 Marines continued their eastward advance while the 3/3 Marines continued advancing northwest in the hope of squeezing the VC between them. At 11:00 HMM-261 helicopters began landing the 2nd Battalion, 1st Marines at the hamlet of Cam La, 8 km southeast of Quế Sơn to seal off any escape route to the south. As the helicopters descended they were hit by 12/7mm machine gun fire from Hill 407 2 km south of Cam La and the remaining helicopters were diverted to another landing zone further west. Company F, 2/1 Marines which had landed at the original landing zone was soon pinned down by machine gun and mortar fire. Company E, 2/7 Marines was ordered to assist Company F, but they also came under intense fire on their right flank before being able to provide covering fire to allow Company F to withdraw. At dusk 2/1 Marines and Company F, 2/7 Marines were able to join forces, Companies E and F had lost 20 dead that day. During the course of the day Henderson had ordered the Task Force Delta headquarters to move 3 times severely disrupting command and communications. MG Walt relieved BG Henderson of command of Task Force Delta, replacing him with BG Jonas M. Platt, who ordered Company G, 2/7 Marines to reinforce 1/2 Marines, joining them at 03:00 on 11 December.

On the morning of 11 December BG Platt ordered the 2/7 Marines to capture Hill 407, which they achieved unopposed, while 3/3 Marines searched north of the hill meeting minimal opposition, Platt suspected that the VC had retreated into the Phước Hà Valley, 5 km southeast and running parallel to the Quế Sơn Valley, a known VC base area. On the afternoon of the 11th BG William E. DePuy, Chief of Staff of Operations for Military Assistance Command, Vietnam visited BG Platt's command post and offered him B-52 strikes before sending his Marines into the Phước Hà Valley. On the morning of 12 December the B-52s began hitting the valley and that afternoon 2/1 Marines deployed south of the valley, while 3/3 Marines deployed on 2 ridgelines to the north of the valley. On 13 December, following further B-52 strikes the 2 battalions moved into the valley from the north and south finding large quantities of abandoned supplies and equipment but few VC.

While the search of the Phước Hà Valley took place, the 2/7 Marines patrolled the Khang River encountering few VC but losing numerous Marines who had to be evacuated for Trench foot. On 18 December as 2/7 Marines advanced through the village of Ky Phu, 6.5 km west of Route 1 they were ambushed by the VC 8th Battalion. Two VC companies attempted to separate Companies G and F in the lead from the Headquarters Company and Company H, 2nd Battalion, 9th Marines to the rear, which were also hit by VC mortar fire. Companies G and F turned and attacked the VC flank supported by helicopter gunship fire and artillery fire from Battery M, 4/11th Marines, allowing the Headquarter Company to reach Ky Phu. Company H, 2/9 Marines remained cut off and engaged by the VC and with the Company commander killed, the artillery forward observer 1Lt Harvey C. Barnum Jr. took command of the Company and established a defensive perimeter which fought off the VC for the next 4 hours before they could rejoin 2/7 Marines in Ky Phu. The Marines had lost 11 dead in the battle, while the VC had lost 104 dead. Barnum would later be awarded the Medal of Honor.

== Aftermath ==
Operation Harvest Moon/Lien Ket 18 concluded on 20 December, the Marines had 45 killed, the ARVN 90 killed and 91 missing and the Vietcong 407 killed and 33 captured.
