= Jonas M. Platt =

U.S. Marine Corps Major General

Jonas Mansfield Platt
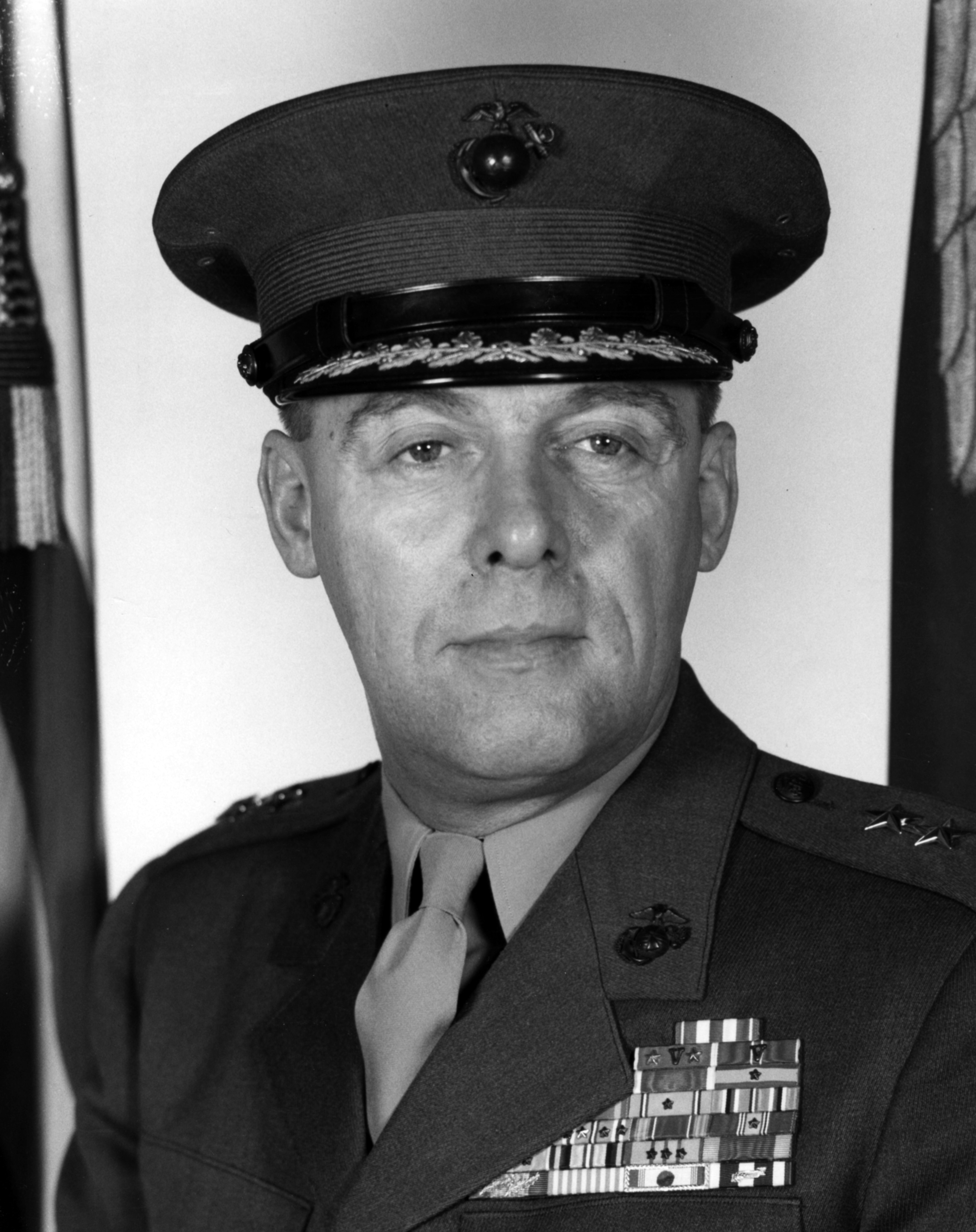
- Major general Jonas M. Platt, USMC
- Born: September 21, 1919; New York City, US
- Died: July 28, 2000 (aged 80); Sterling, Virginia, US
- Burial place: Arlington National Cemetery
- Military career
- Allegiance: United States
- Branch: United States Marine Corps
- Service years: 1940–1970
- Rank: Major general
- Nickname: "Joe"
- Service number: 0-6644
- Commands: Chief of Staff of III MAF; ADC, 3rd Marine Division; The Basic School; 6th Marine Regiment; Marine Barracks, Washington, D.C. 1st Battalion, 5th Marines
- Conflicts: World War II: Arctic convoys; Naval Battle of Guadalcanal; Battle of Tarawa; Battle of Kwajalein; Battle of Peleliu; Battle of Okinawa; Korean War: Battle for Outpost Vegas; Battle of the Samichon River; Suez Crisis; Cuban Missile Crisis; Vietnam War: Operation Harvest Moon; Operation Double Eagle; Operation Utah
- Awards: Distinguished Service Medal; Silver Star; Legion of Merit (3); Bronze Star Medal; Purple Heart; Commendation Medal

Jonas Mansfield Platt (September 21, 1919 – July 28, 2000) was highly decorated officer in the United States Marine Corps with the rank of major general. A veteran of three wars, Platt is most noted for his service during Vietnam War as assistant division commander, 3rd Marine Division and commander of Task Force Delta. He was also a member of so-called "Chowder Society", special Marine Corps Board, which was tasked to conduct research and prepare material relative to postwar legislation concerning the role of the Marine Corps in national defense.

== Early career and World War II ==
Jonas M. Platt was born September 21, 1919, in Brooklyn, New York, as the son of Harold Livingston and Maude Platt. He attended high school in Cranston, Rhode Island, and subsequently enrolled the Norwich University in Northfield, Vermont. He graduated in May 1940 with Bachelor of Science degree in civil engineering and entered Marine Corps service one month later. Platt was commissioned second lieutenant on June 29 and ordered to the Officer Candidates School at Quantico, Virginia, for further officer training.

After a three-months course there, he was attached to the Marine detachment aboard the battleship USS Washington. Platt participated in the Russian convoy operations in the Norwegian Sea in April 1942. He was promoted to the rank of first lieutenant and captain consecutively and assumed command of the detachment, when he relieved James D. Hittle.

Platt sailed with Washington to the Pacific theater and took part in the Naval Battle of Guadalcanal in November 1942, support actions during Battle of Tarawa in November 1943 and Battle of Kwajalein in January 1944. He then served in the United States for four months before joined 3rd Battalion, 1st Marines at Pavuvu, Russell Islands as major and battalion operations officer.

His battalion participated as the part of 1st Marine Division in the bloody Battle of Peleliu in September 1944 and received Navy Commendation Medal with Combat "V" and Navy Presidential Unit Citation for his service there.

Platt was later transferred to the 1st Battalion, 1st Marines and served as battalion executive officer under Lieutenant Colonel Richard P. Ross Jr. during the Battle of Okinawa in April 1945. He remained in that capacity until the end of month and subsequently assumed duty as Operations officer of 1st Marine Regiment under Colonel Arthur T. Mason. Platt distinguished himself in this capacity and received the Bronze Star Medal with Combat "V". He also received his second Navy Presidential Unit Citation and Purple Heart for wounds.

== Postwar service ==
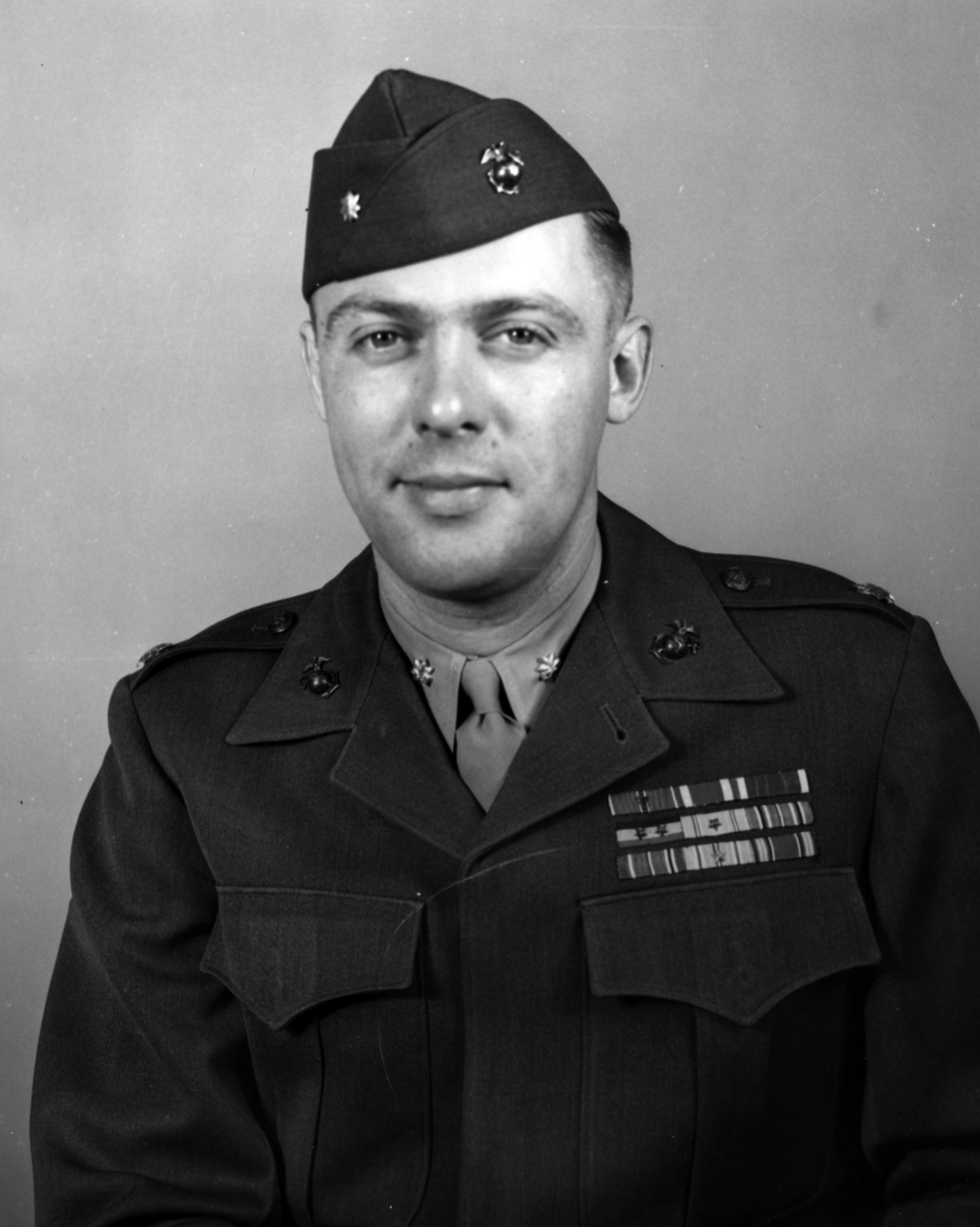
Platt as Major in April 1948

Following the War, Platt spent brief period in the Naval Hospital, San Diego during his recovery from wounds sustained on Okinawa and subsequently organized and commanded the Provisional Marine Guard Detachment at the United Nations Headquarters in New York City during the establishment of the United Nations in June 1945.

=== Chowder Society ===
The existence of the Marine Corps as the independent service was in question in 1945–1947, because newly appointed President Harry S. Truman intended the reorganize the United States Armed Forces. Due to cuts in Marine Corps budget, the threat of merging in the United States Army was more realistic. Platt was meanwhile transferred to the Division of Plans and Policies at Headquarters Marine Corps under Brigadier General Gerald C. Thomas and was attached to the so-called "Chowder Society", special Marine Corps Board under general Thomas, which was tasked by Commandant Alexander Vandegrift to conduct research and prepare material relative to postwar legislation concerning the role of the Marine Corps in national defense.

While in this assignment, Platt had the opportunity to cooperate with great names of modern Marine history such as: Merrill B. Twining, Victor H. Krulak, Merritt A. Edson, Robert E. Hogaboom, James E. Kerr, James C. Murray, James D. Hittle, DeWolf Schatzel, Samuel R. Shaw, Robert D. Heinl, Edward H. Hurst or Marine Corps Reserve officers John R. Blandford, Arthur B. Hanson, Lyford Hutchins, and William McCahill.

Their effort contributed to the preservation of the Constitution's provision of civilian oversight of the military and we can say they helped to save Marine Corps. Platt later earned master's degree in psychology at Ohio State University during summer 1949 and subsequently was appointed instructor of infantry tactics and instructional techniques at the Marine Corps Schools, Quantico. He was promoted to the rank of lieutenant colonel on August 1, 1948.

=== Korea ===
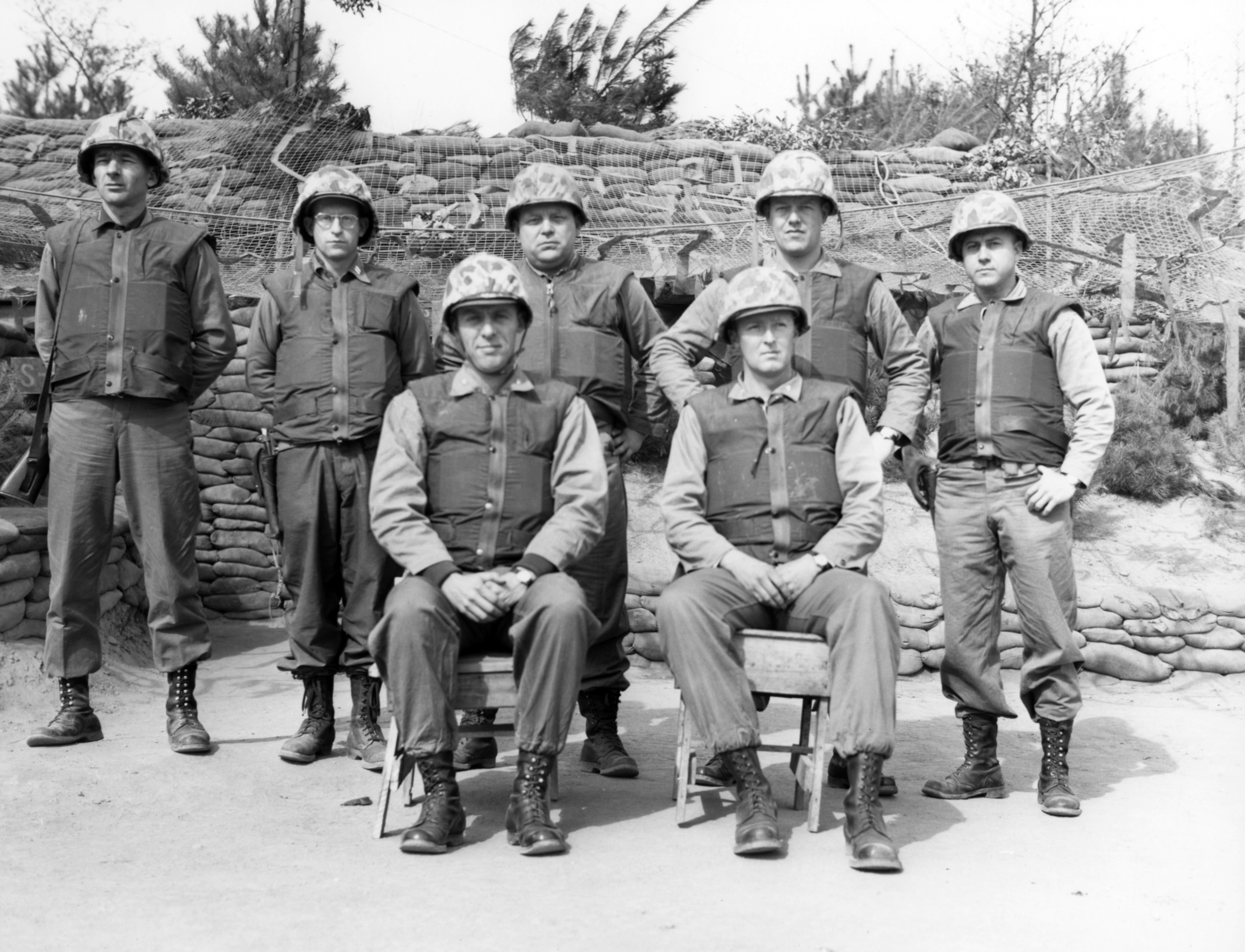
Lt.Col. Platt (sitting on the left), commanding officer of 1st Battalion, 5th Marines with the officer group of his battalion at Chajang-ni, Korea

Platt served in this capacity until December 1952 and then was ordered for combat duty to Korea. He joined 5th Marine Regiment, 1st Marine Division and served under Colonel Lewis W. Walt as commanding officer of 1st Battalion. His battalion was stationed on the Main line of resistance (MLR) in Western Korea and tasked with the defense of "Nevada Cities"—systems of bunkers and outposts on the MLR, which oversaw the enemy's rear.

The Chinese communists forces activity consisted mainly of patrolling and there was no significant enemy activity. However situation has changed in the night on March 26, 1953, when Chinese launched offensive against outposts Vegas, Carson, and Reno. Under constant enemy artillery and mortar fire and with no contact with front units, Platt and his battalion had keep their sector and drove all Chinese troops back to their lines.

In mid-April 1953, regimental commander, Colonel Walt, was appointed 1st Marine Division Operations officer. Aware of Platt's organizational qualities, he requested him to be attached to the operations section under his command. Platt relinquished command of 1st Battalion to lieutenant colonel Jackson B. Butterfield on April 29, 1953, and joined Divisional Operations section (G-3). He served in this capacity during the battle of the Samichon River in July of that year and following the Korean Armistice Agreement signed on July 27, Platt participated with the division in the guarding of the newly created Korean Demilitarized Zone. He was finally ordered back to the United States in mid-September 1953 and received the Legion of Merit with Combat "V" for his service in Korea.

=== 1953–1965 ===
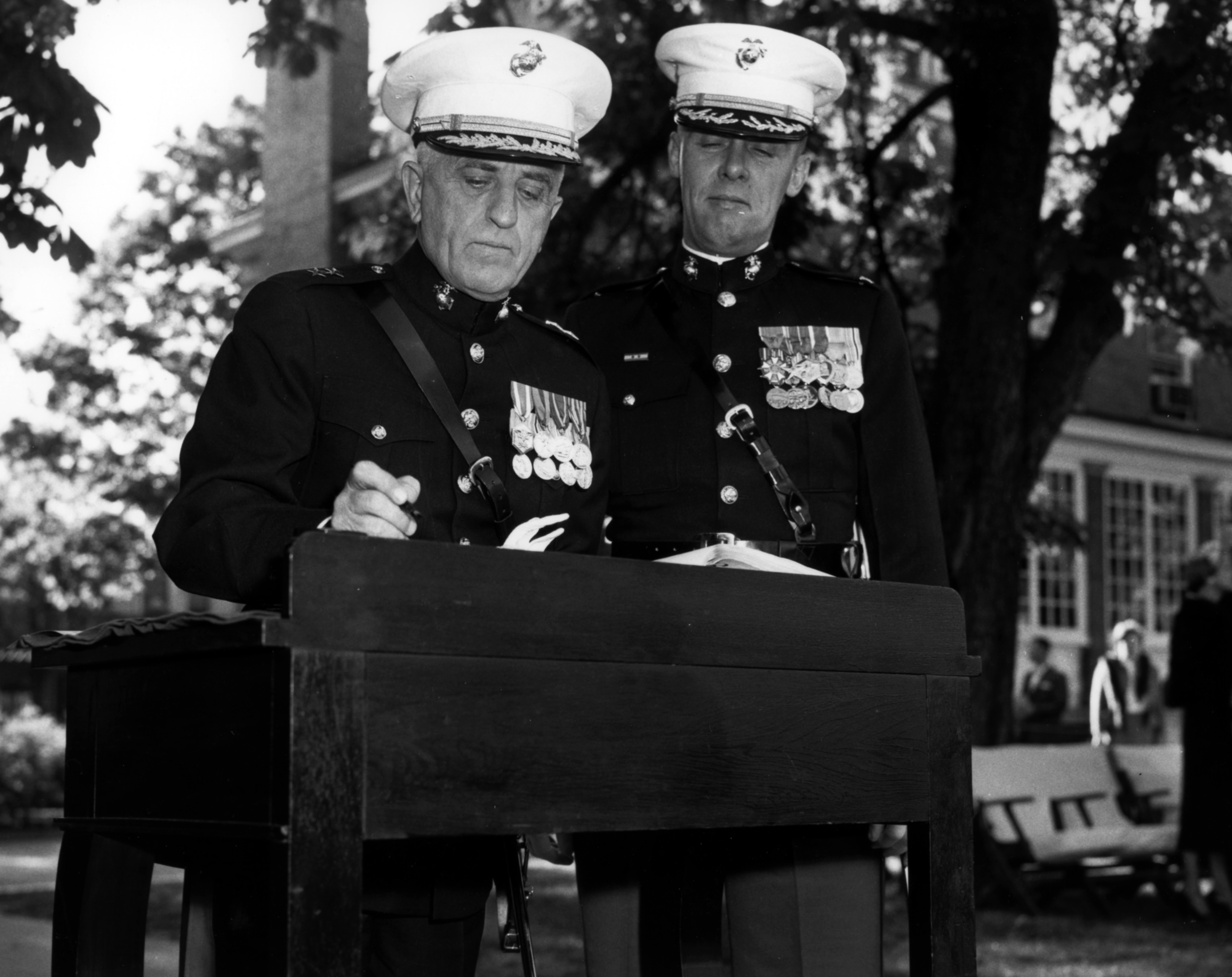
Platt (right) looks on, when MG Roy M. Gulick signs on the guest book during the Sunset Parade at the Marine Barracks, Washington, D.C.

Platt then briefly served at the Headquarters Marine Corps in Washington, D.C., before joined U.S. Joint Staff in London, United Kingdom. While in this capacity, he served briefly as an observer in the Mediterranean during the Suez Crisis in fall 1956. While in London, Platt was promoted to the rank of colonel on July 1, 1957.

He returned to the United States in summer 1958 and assumed command of Marine Barracks, Washington, D.C., the oldest Post in the Corps. Platt served in this capacity until June 1960 when he was ordered for instruction to the National War College. He graduated following June and assumed command of 6th Marine Regiment, 2nd Marine Division at Camp Lejeune, North Carolina on July 10, 1961. Platt was transferred to the Divisional staff in July 1962 and assumed duty as operations officer under Major General Ormond R. Simpson. During the Cuban Missile Crisis in October 1962, Platt deployed with part of his division to Guantanamo Bay, Cuba and remained there until December of that year, when crisis faded out.

Platt assumed command of the Basic School at Marine Corps Base Quantico, Virginia, in summer 1963 and was responsible for the training of newly commissioned marine officers. He remained in this capacity until mid-October 1965, when he received word of his promotion to the rank of brigadier general and deployment to Vietnam.

== Vietnam War ==
=== Operation Harvest Moon ===
Recently promoted Platt arrived to Chu Lai, South Vietnam on November 5, 1965, and relieved Brigadier General Frederick J. Karch as assistant division commander, 3rd Marine Division. In this capacity, he served as deputy under his old friend from Korea, major general Lewis W. Walt and also held additional duty as Chu Lai Base coordinator. The typical command structure of the Marine division was divided between division commanding general and his assistant commander. The situation in Vietnam demanded the appointing of the second assistant division commander.

Platt shared this responsibility with brigadier general Melvin D. Henderson, who was also named commander of Task Force Delta for forthcoming Operation Harvest Moon in Quế Sơn Valley. The operation was launched at the beginning of December with the aim of neutralizing of Viet Cong (VC) forces in Quế Sơn Valley. On the first day of the operation, an Army of the Republic of Vietnam (ARVN) unit was ambushed by VC not far from Highway 534. Henderson ordered his marines to relieve ARVN unit from the encirclement, but his units stuck in fights with the VC that lasted all night. Henderson sent elements of 2nd Battalion, 1st Marines to support encircled units, but several of their helicopters were hit by anti-aircraft gunfire. Each time, Henderson ordered a marine unit to relieve pressure on another unit, the aiding unit would be ambushed. Together, marine units were trapped for ten hours and suffered over 100 casualties with 20 Marines killed.

General Walt was not pleased with the situation and replaced Henderson with Platt on December 10. Platt ordered another battalion to reinforce to struggling marines near Highway 534, but the VC had meanwhile retreated to the mountains. He ordered a search for the VC, finding only large quantities of abandoned supplies and equipment but few VC. Task Force Delta was ambushed by VC guerillas near the village of Ky Phu on December 18 and after two days of heavy fighting, the operation was declared successful. Platt was decorated with the Silver Star for his leadership and bravery during the operation.

Platt then served as single Assistant Division Commander, 3rd Marine Division until December 22, when brigadier general Lowell English assumed Henderson's duty. Platt retained his second assistant division commander status and subsequently returned to Chu Lai Base, where he coordinated 3rd Marine Division activities there. He was responsible for the 14,000 Marines at Chu Lai, the defense of the base, and all tactical ground operations. He had operational control of two reinforced infantry regiments, the 4th and 7th Marines, and the artillery group, consisting of the 3rd Battalion, 11th Marines and the 3rd Battalion, 12th Marines. As the Chu Lai Base Coordinator, General Platt directed the security arrangements for the two Marine aircraft groups, Colonel Leslie E. Brown's MAG-12 and Colonel William G. Johnson's MAG-36, as well as for the Chu Lai Logistic Support Unit.

=== Operation Double Eagle ===
The planning of Operation Double Eagle was ordered by General William Westmoreland in December 1965 in order to prepare military operation against the enemy buildup in the region of the I and II Corps border during late January. Platt received orders to activate Task Force Delta from General Walt on January 6, 1966, and commence planning the operation in coordination with ARVN 2nd Division commander General Hoàng Xuân Lãm. The main objective of the operation was to engage People's Army of Vietnam (PAVN) 18th and 95th Regiments and the Viet Cong 2nd Regiment in Quảng Ngãi Province.

The operation commenced on January 28, 1966, and Platt went ashore during the mid-afternoon of that day and assumed operational command. However, the PAVN and VC had largely withdrawn from the area and the operation had minimal results. By February 17 Marines killed 312 enemy combatants and captured 19 others. General Platt's men also captured 20 tons of rice, 6 tons of salt, and 4 tons of miscellaneous supplies including barley, copra, corn, concrete, and fertilizer. In addition, the Marines captured 18 weapons and 868 rounds of am munition. These results were achieved at the cost of 24 Marines killed and 156 wounded.

Although the operation was declared over, commander of III Marine Amphibious Force, General Walt had received intelligence reports that the VC 1st Regiment was entering the Que Son Valley. Platt received orders to launch immediately Operation Double Eagle II in that region. The 1st Regiment was not in the area and interrogation of VC prisoners revealed that the unit had withdrawn long before the Marines arrived. For the next 10 days, the Marines swept through numerous villages, cleared out isolated guerrilla bands, and uncovered enemy supplies, but found no major VC units. Task Force Delta accounted for 125 enemy dead and 15 captured. Marine losses were six killed and 136 wounded. The Marines also captured or destroyed caches including 28 tons of rice, 500 pounds of sweet potatoes, 53 weapons, and 450 rounds of ammunition.

On February 27, the VC tried to assault Platt's headquarters near the village of Tam Ky, but were repulsed. The opportunity to kill Platt was too attractive for VC, that they tried to ambushed his headquarters one day later. They dressed in ARVN uniforms and tried to assault Platt's command post, but were recognized by Marines and killed just short of his tent.

=== Operation Utah ===
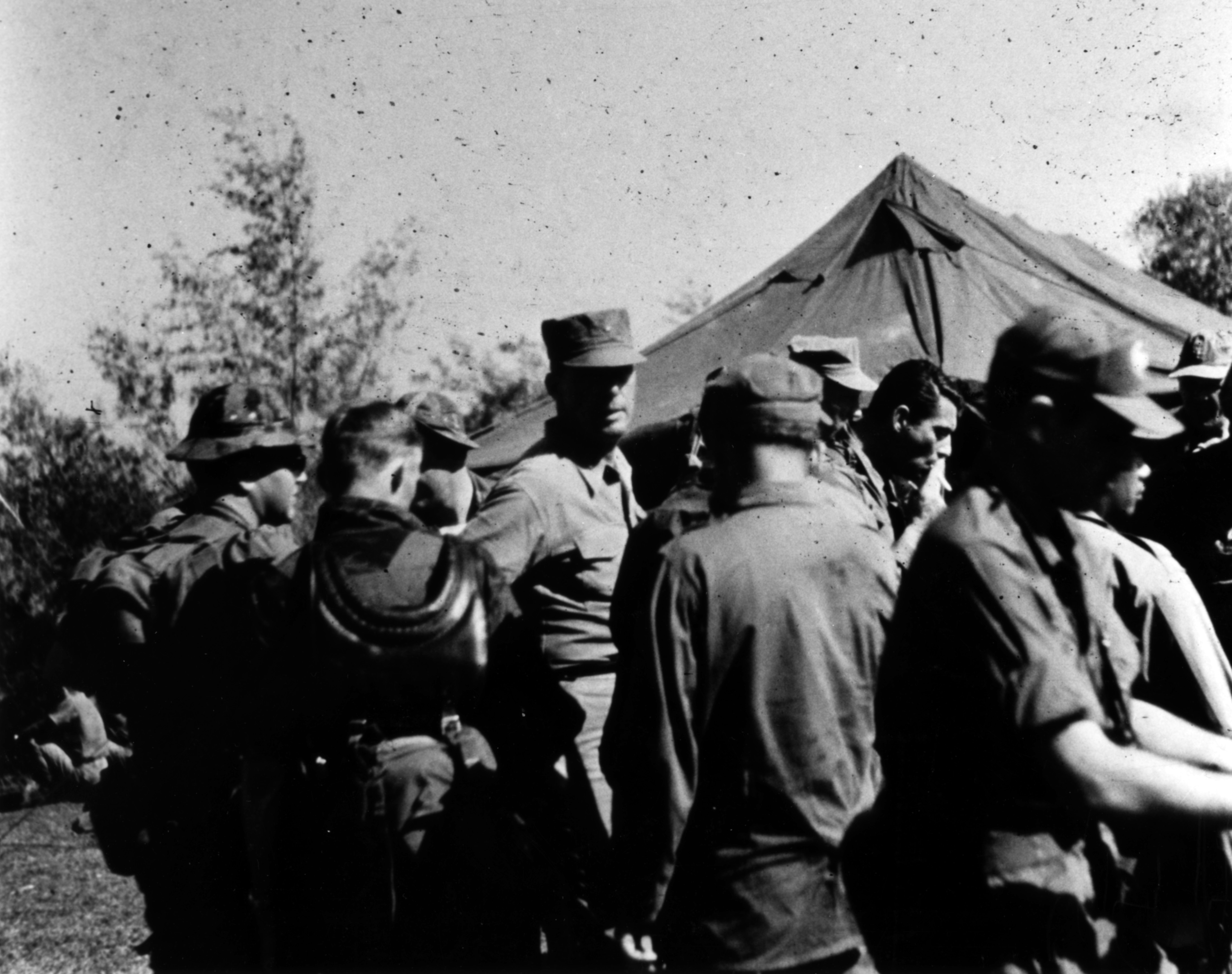
Brigadier General Jonas M. Platt, commanding general of Task Force Delta briefs press on Operation Utah

Following the Operation Double Eagle, which brought inconclusive results, Platt had received intelligence report that PAVN 21st Regiment moved into a region seven miles northwest of Quang Ngai City. Following the planning in cooperation with generals English and McCutcheon, Platt launched the Operation Utah on March 4, 1966, and ordered airstrikes on the landing zone at Chau Nhai. The incoming helicopters of Marine Aircraft Group 36 were met with intense anti-aircraft fire and one UH-1E gunship of VMO-6 and an F-4 from VMFA-531 were shot down. Both crews survived and were evacuated. The ARVN Airborne, which landed first encountered little resistance in the landing zones and advanced to Chau Nhai and Hill 50, where they encountered strong opposition.

Platt had ordered 2nd Battalion, 7th Marines to deploy in the landing zone. They came under intense fire from two PAVN infantry battalions, which were entrenched on Hill 50. The subsequent combats lasted all night and marines were supplied by air. Platt ordered an attack on the PAVN's anti-aircraft positions and his marines killed 20 PAVN soldiers. They also marked the PAVN positions for air support and artillery fire.

The PAVN forces planned to attack the marine position, which Platt quickly realized and ordered the deployment of 3rd Battalion, 1st Marines and 2nd Battalion, 4th Marines in order to reinforce defensive positions. The PAVN forces launched their attack in the morning of the next day, but were repelled. The operation lasted until March 7 and Marines found more than 600 PAVN bodies on Hill 50 and an extensive tunnel and bunker complex inside the hill which had served as the PAVN Regimental command post. The Marines under Platt's command had suffered 98 dead and 278 wounded. Platt distinguished himself during these three operations and received second Legion of Merit with Combat "V".

=== Buddhist Uprising ===
Following the reorganization of U.S. troops in early 1966, the capacity of second assistant division commander within 3rd Marine Division was terminated and Platt was appointed chief of staff, III Marine Amphibious Force under General Walt on March 15. The political situation in South Vietnam was complicated by the fact, that commander of I Corps in Huế, lieutenant general Nguyễn Chánh Thi, oversaw I Corps with a great deal of autonomy and began directing agitation against the government in Saigon. Prime Minister of South Vietnam, Nguyễn Cao Kỳ, ordered relieving of General Thi on March 11, 1966.

This act caused an immediate shock wave throughout I Corps area on the announcement of his removal, approximately 2,000 persons, including ARVN soldiers, marched through the streets of Da Nang and Huế in protest and a general strike was launched. Marines tried to calm down the situation, but without success. Platt took part in the negotiations with rebel ARVN officers and tried to persuade them to cease the rebellion. During a visit to ARVN 1st Division headquarters in Huế, Platt accompanied Major General Huỳnh Văn Cao, who tried to persuade division commander, Brigadier General Pham Xuan Nhuan, to cooperate with Government forces. Their attempt was not successful and Platt and his companions were attacked by angry crowd, which had broken into the division compound. They hastily boarded the U.S. Army helicopter waiting for them and as the aircraft lifted off, a rebel ARVN lieutenant fired two pistol shots at it at point blank range. Although not hitting any of the occupants, both rounds struck the helicopter. After the second shot, the U.S. Army helicopter gunner fired a six-round burst killing the rebel ARVN lieutenant and wounding two other Vietnamese soldiers. The rebel forces immediately made the dead lieutenant a "martyr" to their cause and accused the Americans of blatant interference in South Vietnamese internal affairs. The unrest which was later known as the Buddhist Uprising lasted until June 8, 1966, when Saigon government forces regained control of Da Nang and Huế.

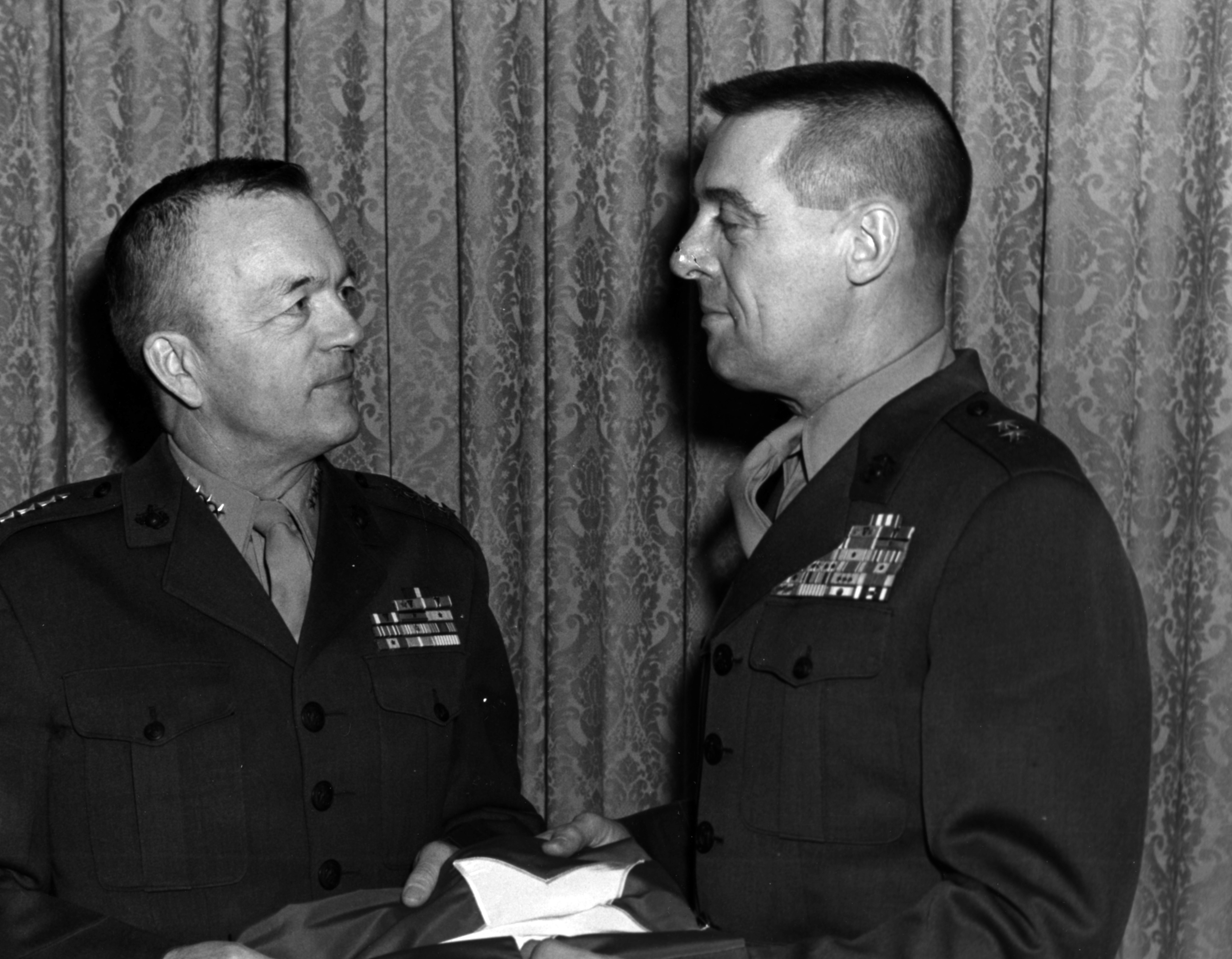
Commandant Leonard F. Chapman Jr. presents Platt with his new two-star flag following his promotion to Major general.

Platt remained in Vietnam until the beginning of December 1966, when he was succeeded by brigadier general Hugh M. Elwood and ordered back to the United States. He received a third Legion of Merit with Combat "V" for his service as chief of staff, III MAF and also was decorated with Vietnam National Order of Vietnam, rank Knight and Vietnam Gallantry Cross with Palm by the Government of South Vietnam.

=== Later service ===
Following his tour of duty in Vietnam, Platt was ordered to Washington, D.C., and attached to the Headquarters Marine Corps as deputy assistant chief of staff, G-1 (Personnel). While in this capacity, he was promoted to the rank of major general on March 19, 1968, and received Navy Distinguished Service Medal for his administrative skills. He served in this capacity until June 30, 1970, when he was succeeded by Major General Edwin B. Wheeler and retired from the Marine Corps after 30 years of active duty.

== Later career ==
Shortly after his retirement from the Marine Corps, Platt was offered the position in the Office of Assistant Secretary of Defense for Manpower and Reserve Affairs, where he served as a personnel management director until 1977. During his service in this capacity, he was decorated with Department of Defense Distinguished Civilian Service Award and Secretary of Defense Meritorious Civilian Service Award. He was also active in the Marine Corps Historical Foundation, where he received a Certificate of Appreciation by then-Commandant Robert H. Barrow for his contributions to the Oral History Program.

He then served on the Council of Advisors on Professional Education for the Marine Corps University, Norwich University’s Board of Trustees, Council on Foreign Relations and the New York Yacht Club.

Platt returned to Vermont in 1984 and died of heart and lung ailments July 28, 2000 at the Falcons Landing retirement community's nursing home in Sterling, Virginia, where he lived last three months of his life. He is buried at Arlington National Cemetery, Virginia, together with both of his wives, Nina Fernandez Platt and Anne Dolores Kasony Platt. Platt had a daughter, Joanne Platt Kilgore, from his first marriage.

== Decorations ==
A complete list of the general's medals and decorations include:

1st Row	Navy Distinguished Service Medal	Silver Star	Legion of Merit with Combat "V" with two 5/16" Gold Stars	Bronze Star Medal with Combat "V"
2nd Row	Navy Commendation Medal with Combat "V"	Purple Heart	Navy Presidential Unit Citation with two stars	Navy Unit Commendation
3rd Row	Department of Defense Distinguished Civilian Service Award	Secretary of Defense Meritorious Civilian Service Award	American Defense Service Medal with Fleet Clasp	American Campaign Medal
4th Row	European–African–Middle Eastern Campaign Medal with one 3/16 inch service star	Asiatic-Pacific Campaign Medal with 3/16 inch silver and two bronze service stars	World War II Victory Medal	National Defense Service Medal with one star
5th Row	Korean Service Medal with two 3/16 inch bronze service stars	Armed Forces Expeditionary Medal	Vietnam Service Medal with three 3/16 inch bronze service starss	Vietnam National Order of Vietnam, Knight
6th Row	Vietnam Gallantry Cross with Palm	United Nations Korea Medal	Republic of Korea Presidential Unit Citation	Vietnam Campaign Medal
