= Operation Double Eagle =

Part of the Vietnam War (1966)

- Part of Vietnam War
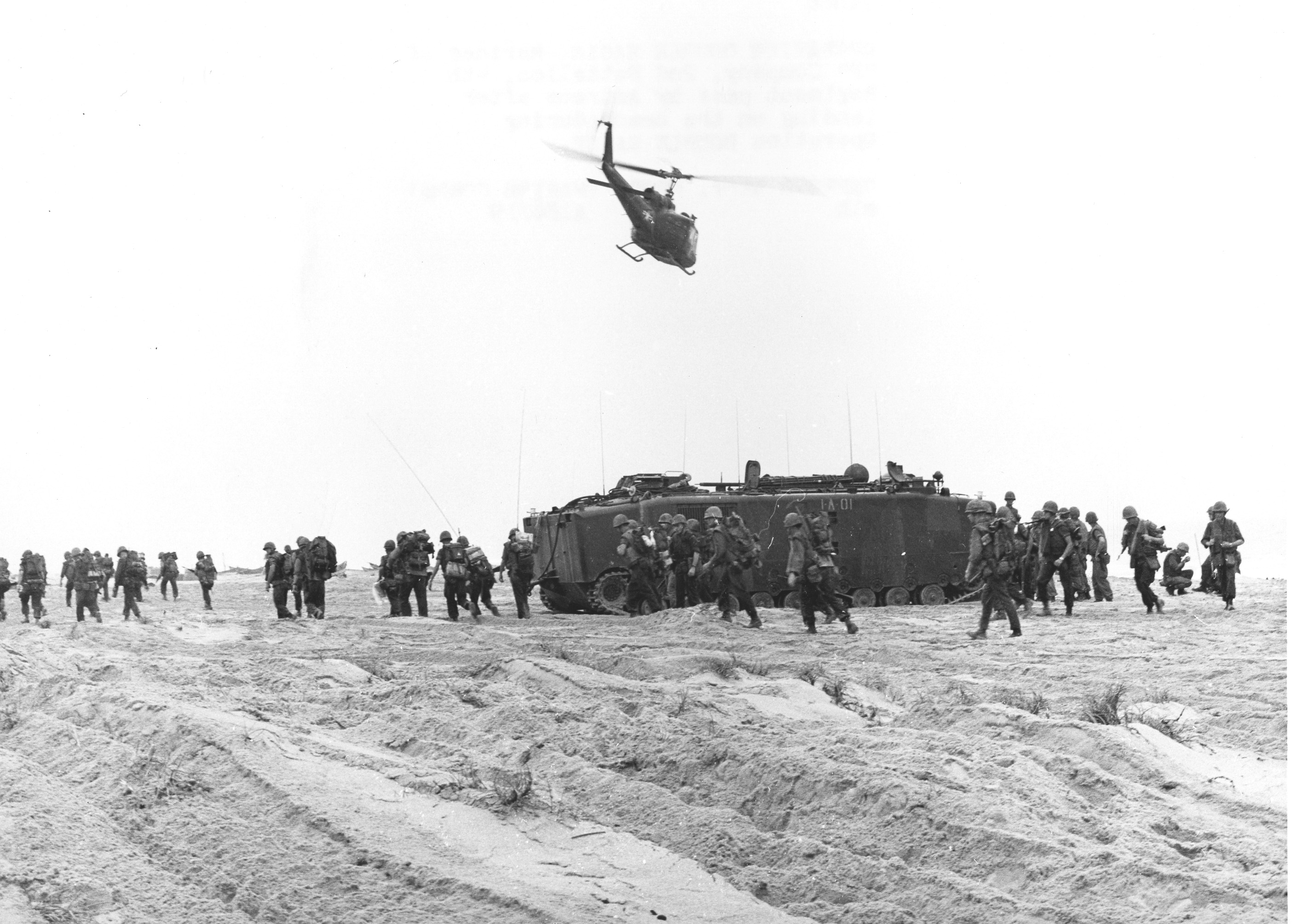
- Company F, 2/4 Marines pass an LVT-5
Date	28 January – 17 February 1966
Location	Quảng Ngãi Province, South Vietnam
Result	Inconclusive

Belligerents
United States; South Vietnam	North Vietnam; Viet Cong

Commanders and leaders
(United States) BG Jonas M. Platt (South Vietnam) Gen. Hoàng Xuân Lãm	

Units involved
(United States) III MAF; 3rd Bn., 1st Marines; 2nd Bn., 3rd Marines; 2nd Bn., 4th Marines; 2nd Bn., 9th Marines; 3rd Bn., 11th Marines; 3rd Bn., 12th Marines; 1st FORECON Co.; Company B, 3rd Reconnnaissance Bn.; (South Vietnam) I Corps; 2nd Division	(North Vietnam) B1 Front; 18th Inf. Regiment; 95th Inf. Regiment; 2nd Inf. Regiment

Casualties and losses
(United States) 24 killed	312 killed 19 captured 18 weapons recovered

Operation Double Eagle was a US Marine Corps and Army of the Republic of Vietnam (ARVN) operation that took place in southern Quảng Ngãi Province, lasting from 28 January to 17 February 1966, during the Vietnam War. The operation was mounted in conjunction with Operation Masher in northern Bình Định Province. The operation was inconclusive as the People's Army of Vietnam (PAVN) and the Vietcong (VC) had largely slipped away.

== Background ==
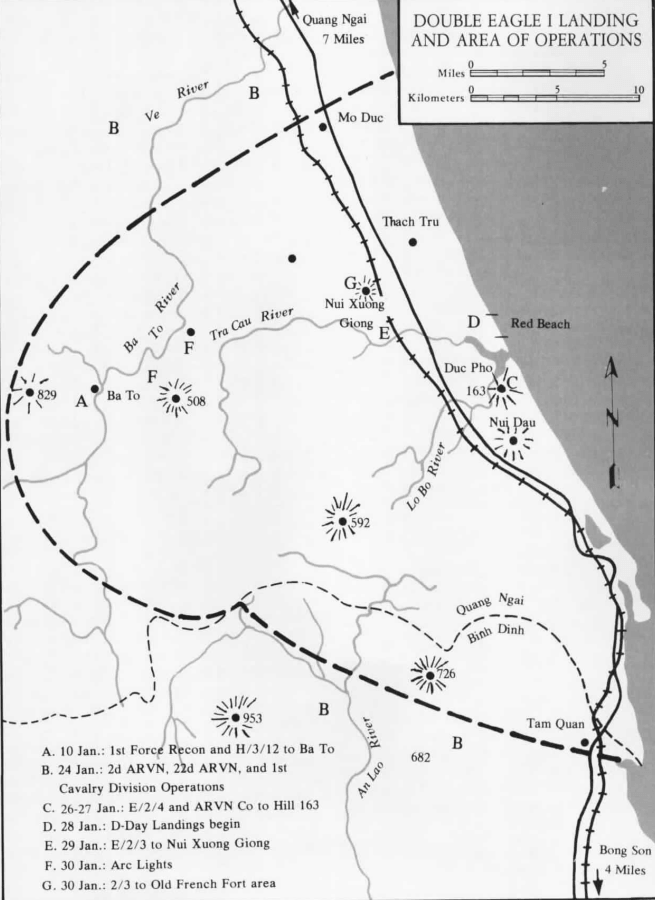
Operation Double Eagle - Phase I

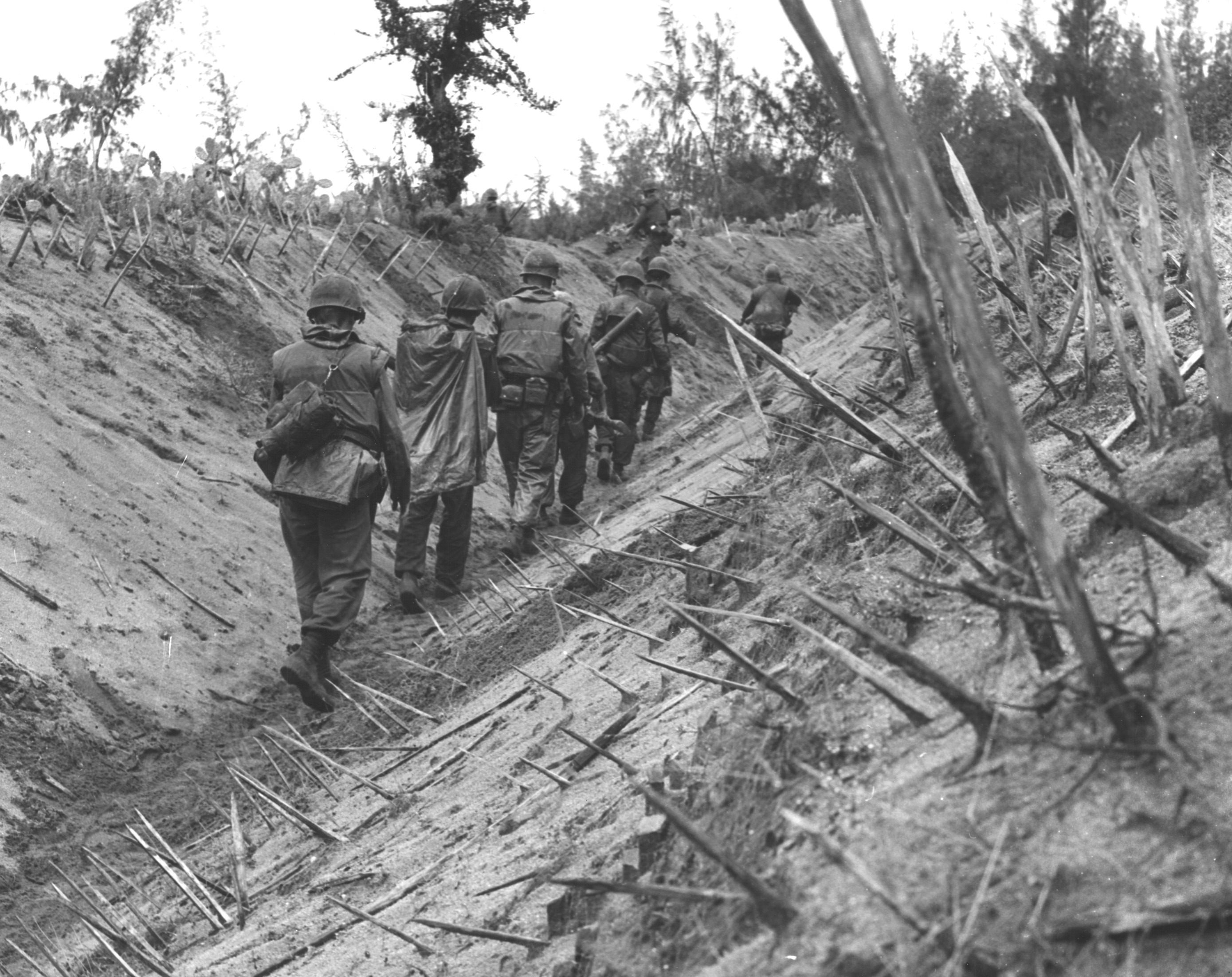
Company F, 2/4 Marines pass through a punji-staked gulley

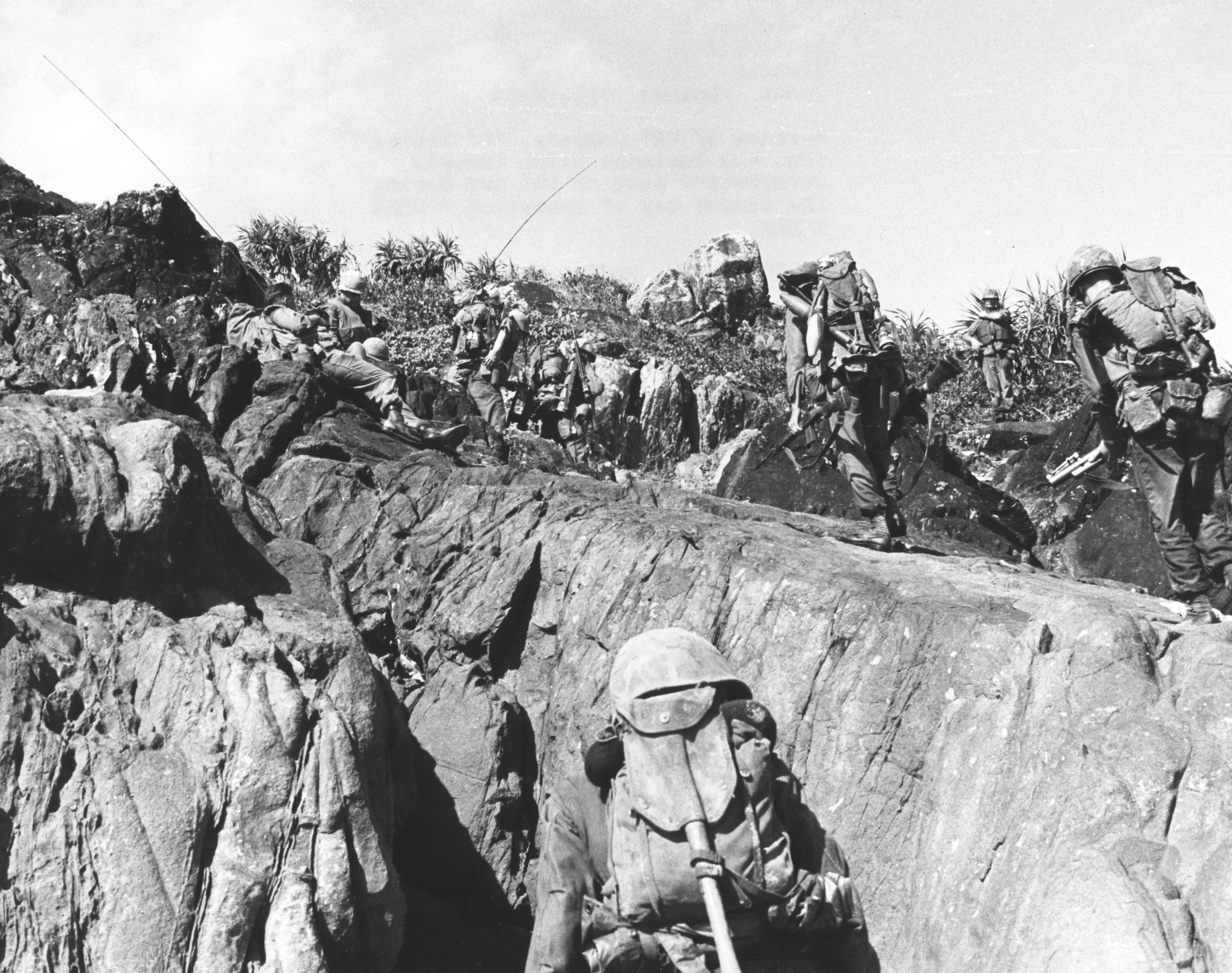
Company E, 2/4 Marines climb towards observation post on Nui Dau

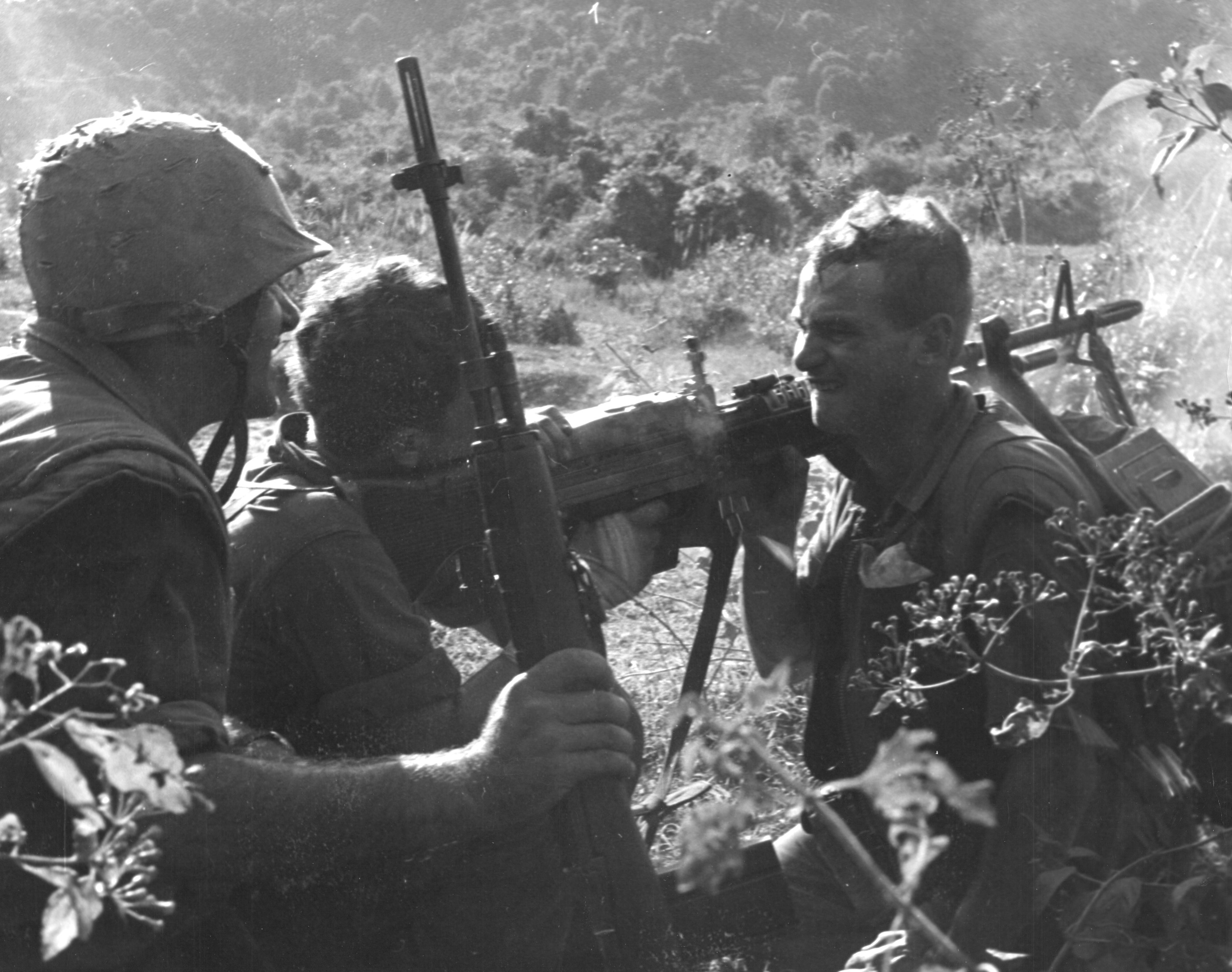
Marine machine gun is fired over the shoulder of assistant gunner to clear dense foliage

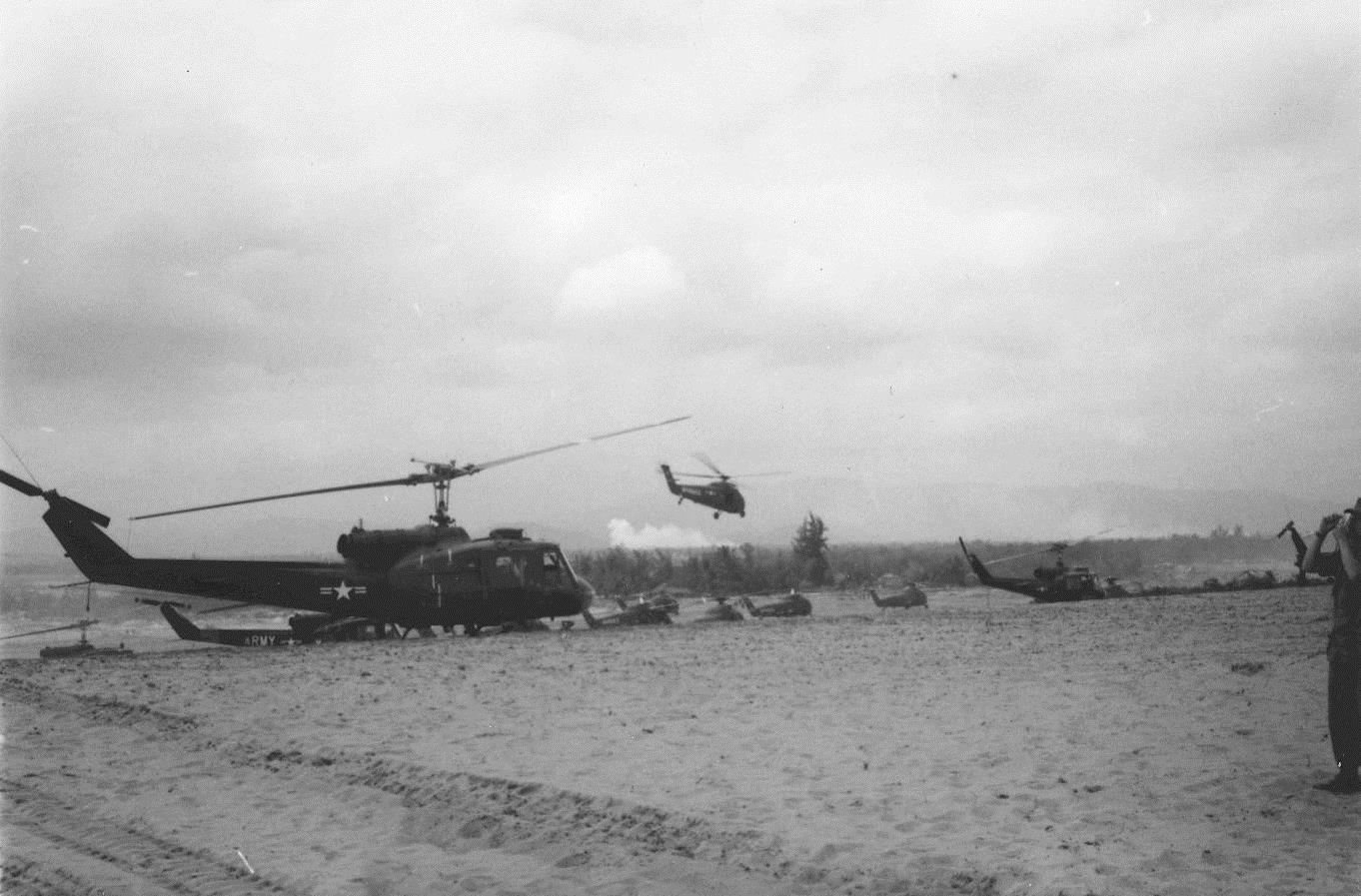
"Johnson City" helicopter forward operating base

On 7 December 1965 COMUSMACV General William Westmoreland instructed III Marine Amphibious Force (III MAF) and I Field Force, Vietnam to prepare plans for operations in the I Corps/II Corps border area to commence in late January. On 6 January III MAF commander LG Lewis W. Walt instructed BG Jonas M. Platt to reestablish Task Force Delta and commence planning the operation in coordination with ARVN 2nd Division commander General Hoàng Xuân Lãm.

It was believed that the PAVN 18th and 95th Regiments and the VC 2nd Regiment were operating in Quảng Ngai Province, but that their base areas were located further south in the coastal areas of Bình Định Province. The Marines and ARVN would attempt to engage the PAVN/VC while the 1st Cavalry Division in the complementary Operation Masher would attack the base areas.

The Marines' operation plan would consist of 3 phases: first Marine reconnaissance units and an artillery battery would be landed at Ba Tơ Special Forces Camp and a company from 2nd Battalion, 4th Marines with units from the ARVN 2nd Division would reconnoiter the landing beach (named Red Beach) (14.836°N 108.995°E) 3.5 miles (5.6 km) northeast of Đức Phổ. On 27 January another company from 2/4 Marines and a company from the ARVN 4th Regiment would secure Hill 163 (14.822°N 108.997°E) south of Red Beach. On 28 January Battalion Landing Teams (BLTs) 3rd Battalion, 1st Marines and 2/4 Marines would make an amphibious landing on Red Beach and secure the area. Two days later following B-52 strikes further inland, the Marines would move by helicopter to cut off any PAVN/VC attempting to retreat west. Meanwhile, the ARVN 2nd Division would operate to the south along the Quảng Ngai/Bình Định provincial border blocking any retreat in that direction.

On 10 January 2 platoons from 1st Force Reconnaissance Company and 4 105 mm howitzers of Battery H, 3rd Battalion, 12th Marines were landed by helicopter at Ba Tơ Special Forces Camp and the reconnaissance Marines began patrols from the base. On the afternoon of 21 January a 14-man patrol was attacked by PAVN/VC at the base of Hill 829 (14.799°N 108.691°E) 4 km northwest of Ba Tơ with the artillery forward observer going missing. The next day the Marines were again attacked by PAVN/VC and scattered into bush where they were later rescued by helicopters covered by helicopter gunships, losing another Marine missing.

On 13 January the company from 2/4 Marines and the ARVN Reconnaissance Company, 2nd Division completed their reconnaissance of Red Beach.

On 24 January the 1st Cavalry Division began Operation Masher.

On 26 January HMM-261 helicopters landed Company E, 2/4 Marines at the ARVN Nui Dau base 8 miles (13 km) south of Red Beach and after midnight on 27 January Company E and the ARVN 2nd Company, 3rd Battalion began a night march to Hill 163 arriving at 13:00 on 27 January.

== Operation ==
D-Day 28 January was rainy with low clouds however the landings proceeded smoothly with BLT 3/1 Marines on Red Beach by 07:00. The landing was supported by naval gunfire support from USS Oklahoma City and USS Barry and air support from Marine Aircraft Group 11 and Marine Aircraft Group 12, however opposition was minimal. BLT 2/4 Marines and Battery H 3rd Battalion, 11th Marines landed by midday but worsening weather in the afternoon delayed further amphibious landings and buildup of forces ashore.

The bad weather continued into 29 January. Company E 2/4 Marines left Hill 163 and rejoined the rest of their battalion. BLT 2nd Battalion, 3rd Marines was landed by HMM-362 helicopters on Nui Xuong Giong (14.81°N 108.96°E), a hill northwest of Red Beach, in the afternoon. Also on 29 January the 2nd Battalion, 9th Marines was flown into Quảng Ngãi Airfield to exploit the results of the B-52 strikes scheduled for the next day.

On 30 January, despite efforts by III MAF to postpone the B-52 strikes due to the bad weather, the B-52s hit targets in the Song Ve Valley (14.7996°N 108.736°E), but the Marines were unable to immediately follow up the strikes due to bad weather. That afternoon helicopters moved BLT 2/3 Marines further inland, completing their landing by 17:30. That same afternoon Marine Aircraft Group 36 established a helicopter forward operating base called "Johnson City" 400m inland from Red Beach.

On 31 January the weather began to improve and the Marines began their westward sweep. Helicopters deployed Battery H, 3/11 Marines to BLT 2/3 Marines' position to provide fire support for the advance and that afternoon Company B, 2/4 Marines was landed on Hill 508 (14.7988°N 108.782°E) a further 5 miles (8.0 km) southwest of BLT 2/3 Marines and the rest of 2/4 Marines was landed 2 km further west in the Song Ve Valley itself.

On 1 February the 2/9 Marines command group and 2 companies were landed by helicopters 7 km northwest of 2/4 Marines and the 2 battalions began sweeping the valley. Meanwhile, BLT 2/3 Marines searched to the west of Nui Xuong Giong. The Marines encountered only small groups of PAVN/VC who engaged in hit and run tactics, the only sizable encounter being two skirmishes by 3/1 Marines north of Red Beach killing 31 PAVN/VC.

On 3 February BG Platt ordered his forces to move south in an attempt to press the PAVN/VC against the 1st Cavalry and ARVN in Bình Định Province.

On 11 February, after minimal results in their southern sweep, BG Platt ordered his forces to move back towards Red Beach/Johnson City.

On 12 February a 4-man team from Company B, 3rd Reconnaissance Battalion operating 11 km northwest of Ba Tơ Camp observed a 31-man PAVN/VC force and called in artillery fire killing 10 of them, a further group of more than 80 PAVN/VC then arrived and the team requested helicopter extraction following which airstrikes were called in on the PAVN/VC.

The limited results of the operation indicated that the PAVN/VC were not in the operational area in force and this was confirmed by prisoner interrogations that revealed that the units had left the area several days before D-Day.

== Aftermath ==
Operation Double Eagle concluded on 17 February, the Marines had suffered 24 dead and had a body count of 312 PAVN/VC killed and 19 captured. A total of 18 individual weapons and 868 rounds of ammunition were recovered.

On 19 February after receiving intelligence that the VC 1st Regiment was operating in the Quế Sơn Valley 50 miles (80 km) to the north, BG Platt launched Operation Double Eagle II. BLT 2/3 Marines, 2/9 Marines and 2nd Battalion, 7th Marines were landed at landing zones in the Quế Sơn Valley while 3/1 Marines took up blocking positions west of Tam Kỳ. Over the next 10 days the Marines claimed to have killed 125 VC and captured 10 for the loss of 6 marines killed. On the early morning of 28 February, VC disguised as ARVN soldiers attempted an attack on BG Platt's command post, the VC were identified at the last minute with 2 killed and 1 captured for the loss of 1 Marine killed. Operation Double Eagle II ended on 1 March.

BG Platt regarded the operation as a success because it had inflicted severe damage to local VC forces, however Fleet Marine Force, Pacific commander LG Victor Krulak disagreed, believing that details of the operation had been leaked to the PAVN/VC who were able to withdraw their forces intact and that Vietnamese civilians saw that the Marines "would come in, comb the area and disappear; whereupon the VC would resurface and resume control."
