= Quang Ngai Airfield =

Quảng Ngãi Airfield
- Part of Republic of Vietnam Air Force (VNAF); Military Assistance Command Vietnam

Site information
- Type: Air Force Base
- Condition: Joint Civil/Military Airport

Location
- Location within Vietnam
- Coordinates: 15.1155°N 108.771°E

Site history
- Built: 1966
- In use: 1966-75
- Battles/wars: Vietnam War

Airfield information
- IATA: XNG; ICAO: none

Summary
- Elevation AMSL: 36 ft (11 m)
- Interactive map of Airfield information

Runways
Direction	Length		Surface
Direction	ft	m	Surface
	4,900	1,494	Asphalt

Quảng Ngãi Airfield was a military and civilian airfield, and army base located approximately 4 km west of Quảng Ngãi.

== Vietnam War ==
Detachments from the 20th Tactical Air Support Squadron (20th TASS) operating Cessna O-1 Bird Dogs and later Cessna O-2 Skymasters were based at Quảng Ngãi.

In September 1965, the airfield was used as a staging base for Operation Piranha.

In late January 1966, the airfield was used by the 2nd Battalion, 9th Marines as a staging base for Operation Double Eagle. In March 1966, the base was used by the Marines and Army of the Republic of Vietnam (ARVN) to support Operation Utah. In late 1966, a battery of 4 155mm howitzers of the 4th Battalion, 11th Marines was based at the airfield to provide fire support for the ARVN 2nd Division.

In February 1967, the Marines established a logistics base at the airfield to support Operation Desoto.

In early April 1967, MACV gave instructions to commence the Task Force Oregon plan. This involved the movement of an Army task force to the Chu Lai area, to allow the 1st Marine Division to move north to Danang to support the 3rd Marine Division in northern I Corps. In September 1967, Task Force Oregon became the 23rd Infantry Division, which assumed responsibility for the defense of Quảng Ngãi Province.

In the early morning of 31 January 1968, the airfield and Quảng Ngãi city were attacked by Vietcong forces as part of the Tet Offensive. The attack was repulsed at a cost of 56 ARVN and an estimated 500 plus Vietcong killed.

== Current use ==
The airfield is no longer used, but is still clearly visible on satellite images.
