= Operation Utah =

Part of the Vietnam War (1966)

- Part of the Vietnam War
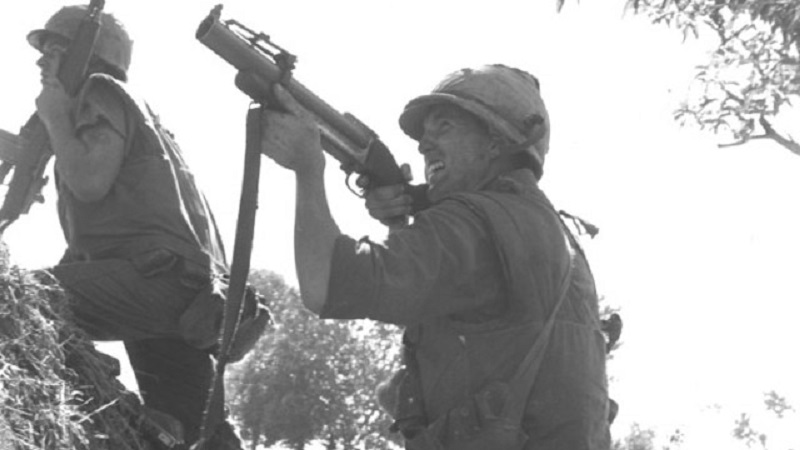
- Company F, 2/7 Marines, Operation Utah
Date	4–7 March 1966
Location	Quảng Ngãi Province, South Vietnam 15.235°N 108.71°E
Result	U.S./ARVN victory

Belligerents
United States; South Vietnam	North Vietnam

Commanders and leaders
(United States) Brig Jonas M. Platt	

Units involved
1st Marine Division; 2nd Battalion, 7th Marines; 3rd Battalion, 1st Marines; 2nd Battalion, 4th Marines (South Vietnam) Airborne Division; 1st Airborne Battalion; 5th Airborne Battalion; 37th Ranger Battalion	21st Regiment

Casualties and losses
(United States) 98 killed (South Vietnam) 30 killed	600 killed 5 captured

Operation Utah was a US Marine Corps and Army of the Republic of Vietnam (ARVN) operation that took place northwest of Quảng Ngãi, lasting from 4–7 March 1966, during the Vietnam War.

== Background ==
Following the conclusion of Operation Double Eagle, the ARVN 2nd Division received intelligence that the People's Army of Vietnam (PAVN) 21st Regiment had moved into the area northwest of Quảng Ngãi. The plan was for the ARVN 1st Airborne Battalion to secure a landing zone at Chau Nhai, 15 km northwest of Quảng Ngãi and the 2nd Battalion, 7th Marines would then deploy into the landing zone and then both Battalions would move southeast along Route 527 with the ARVN patrolling north and the Marines patrolling south of Route 527.

== Operation ==
=== 4 March ===
On the morning of 4 March Marine A-4s and F-4s and U.S. Air Force B-57s carried out airstrikes on the landing zone before the helicopter landings commenced at 09:00, however the incoming helicopters of Marine Aircraft Group 36 were met with intense anti-aircraft fire and one UH-1E gunship of VMO-6 and an F-4 from VMFA-531 were shot down. Despite the persistent anti-aircraft fire by 10:30 the ARVN Airborne had been deployed to the landing zone and encountered little resistance on the ground.

The landing of the Marines which commenced at approximately 10:40 was again met with heavy anti-aircraft fire and one UH-34 was shot down. By 13:00 the entire Battalion had been landed.

As the ARVN moved out of the landing zone they encountered strong opposition around Chau Nhai and Hill 50 (15.22°N 108.717°E) and by 13:30 they had called for support from the Marines, who turned and moved to support the ARVN. As the Marines advanced on Hill 50 they came under intense fire from an estimated force of 2 PAVN Battalions, the lines were so close that the Marines were unable to call in air and artillery support. A gap developed between the Marines left flank and the ARVN as the ARVN refused to moved forward and the PAVN exploited this gap cutting off two platoons of Company F for several hours until supported by Company H.

As darkness approached the Marines withdrew under the cover of air and artillery strikes to night-defensive positions. The PAVN probed the Marine positions at night and helicopter resupply missions were met with anti-aircraft fire. The Marines launched a night assault on an anti-aircraft position killing at least 20 PAVN and continuous air support and artillery fire was directed against PAVN positions and trails leading into the area.

Realising that the PAVN planned to stand and fight, commanding general of Task Force Delta, Brigadier general Jonas M. Platt, ordered the deployment of 3rd Battalion, 1st Marines north of 2/7 Marines and their deployment was completed by 18:00. In addition the next morning the 2nd Battalion, 4th Marines was to be inserted 2.5 km south of 2/7 Marines, while the ARVN 37th Ranger Battalion supported by M113s would establish blocking positions to the east and the 5th Airborne Battalion would be landed in the original landing zone.

=== 5 March ===
At 05:00 the PAVN launched an attack on the ARVN 1st Airborne position near Hill 50 and the Marine artillery responded with more than 1900 rounds on the perimeter over two hours. At 07:30 3/1 Marines was ordered to move south to support the ARVN. As the 3/1 Marines approached the ARVN position at 10:30 they came under heavy fire from entrenched PAVN forces on and around Hill 50. After more than 3 hours fighting the Company L 3/1 Marines and ARVN 1st Airborne captured Hill 50. Company M 3/1 Marines and ARVN 5th Airborne attempted to outflank PAVN positions east of Hill 50 but were unable to do so by nightfall and withdrew to night defensive positions. 3/1 Marines had lost 32 killed and 90 wounded during the day's fighting.

At 08:30 2/4 Marines began landing and were met with intense anti-aircraft fire causing 2 UH-34s to crash-land in the landing zone. One Company stayed to provide security for the downed helicopters while the other two Companies moved north to the site of the previous day's engagement where they established night positions.

At 23:00 Company B from the 1st Battalion, 7th Marines which had been moved into a blocking position northeast of the battle area was hit by intense PAVN mortar and small arms fire. Running short of ammunition the Marines called for an emergency resupply mission and despite heavy anti-aircraft fire two helicopters succeeded in dropping munitions to the Marines. At 01:30 the PAVN attacked the Marine perimeter but were forced back by small arms and artillery fire.

=== 6 March ===
On the morning of 6 March the Marines and ARVN withdrew with minimal opposition from their night positions to allow for an air and artillery bombardment of the PAVN positions lasting more than 2 hours. When the bombardment concluded the Marines and ARVN advanced, but it became clear that most of the PAVN had slipped away the previous night. The Marines found more than 100 PAVN bodies on Hill 50 and an extensive tunnel and bunker complex inside the hill which had served as the PAVN Regimental command post.

== Aftermath ==
Operation Utah concluded on 7 March, the Marines had suffered 98 dead and 278 wounded, the ARVN 30 killed and 120 wounded and the PAVN 600 killed and 5 captured.
