= Hoàng Xuân Lãm =

South Vietnamese Army general

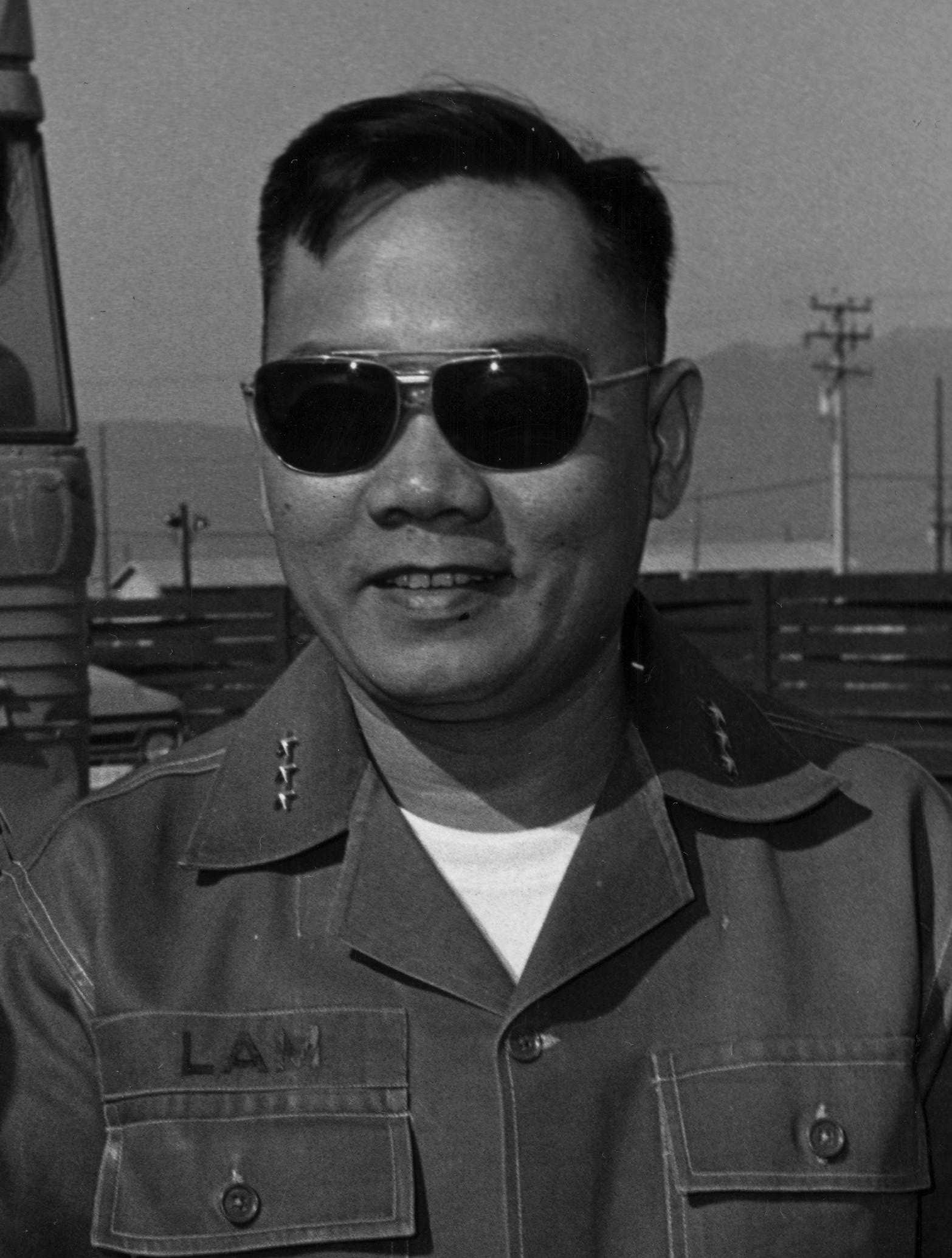
- Born: 10 October 1928; Huế, Annam, French Indochina
- Died: 2 May 2017 (aged 88) Davis, California
- Military career
- Allegiance: State of Vietnam; South Vietnam
- Branch: Vietnamese National Army; Army of the Republic of Vietnam
- Service years: 1950 – April 30, 1975 (Army of the Republic of Vietnam)
- Rank: Lieutenant General
- Commands: 2nd Division; I Corps
- Conflicts: First Indochina War; Vietnam War; Battle of Khe Sanh; Tet Offensive; Operation Lam Son 719; Easter Offensive
- Awards: National Order of Vietnam;

Hoàng Xuân Lãm (10 October 1928, Huế – 2 May 2017, Davis, California) was a South Vietnamese lieutenant general in the Army of the Republic of Vietnam (ARVN).

== Military career ==
In 1964 Lãm commanded the 23rd Division, where his US advisor regarded him as satisfactory.

In late 1965, while Lãm was serving as commander of the 2nd Division, COMUSMACV General William Westmoreland and his chief of staff of operations, General William E. DePuy, blamed the division's temerity on its "less aggressive" commander, who had been either unwilling or unable to get the division moving during the year.

During the Buddhist Uprising he was given command of I Corps on 30 May 1966, becoming the sixth corps commander in less than three months.

During the Battle of Khe Sanh the 1,500 civilians, 400 of which were ethnic Bru, of the area were looking for refuge. Lãm authorized the evacuation of the 1,100 Vietnamese, but the Bru were told to stay, Hoang Xuan Lam insisting that, 'there was no place for minority refugees.

On 14 February 1968, in the midst of the Tet Offensive fighting, COMUSMACV General William Westmoreland urged President Nguyễn Văn Thiệu and Chairman of the Joint General Staff General Cao Văn Viên to make several controversial command changes under the cloak of military necessity. They tentatively agreed to replace all four corps commanders with the II and IV Corps commanders to be replaced immediately.

Lãm commanded Operation Lam Son 719 which aimed at striking the Ho Chi Minh Trail in southeastern Laos during February–March 1971.

Due to his political connections with Thiệu, he was still serving as I Corps commander when the North Vietnamese launched the 1972 Easter Offensive. During the First Battle of Quảng Trị, Lãm had provided little support to General Vũ Văn Giai, commander of the 3rd Division and rarely visited the front line, choosing to monitor the progress of the battle through periodic reports back in Da Nang. Lãm was recalled to Saigon on 2 May 1972 by Thiệu, who relieved him of his command. Lãm was named as a "special assistant" at the Ministry of Defense.

Lãm's replacement as I Corps commander, Lieutenant General Ngô Quang Trưởng, said "I had served in I Corps under General Lãm and the disaster that occurred there was no surprise to me. Neither General Lãm nor his staff were competent to maneuver and support large forces in heavy combat."

== Other awards ==
=== National Honours ===
- Commander of the National Order of Vietnam
- Gallantry Cross with palm

=== Foreign honours ===
- USA :
  - Air Medal
