= Lewis William Walt =

U.S. Marine Corps general (1913–1989)

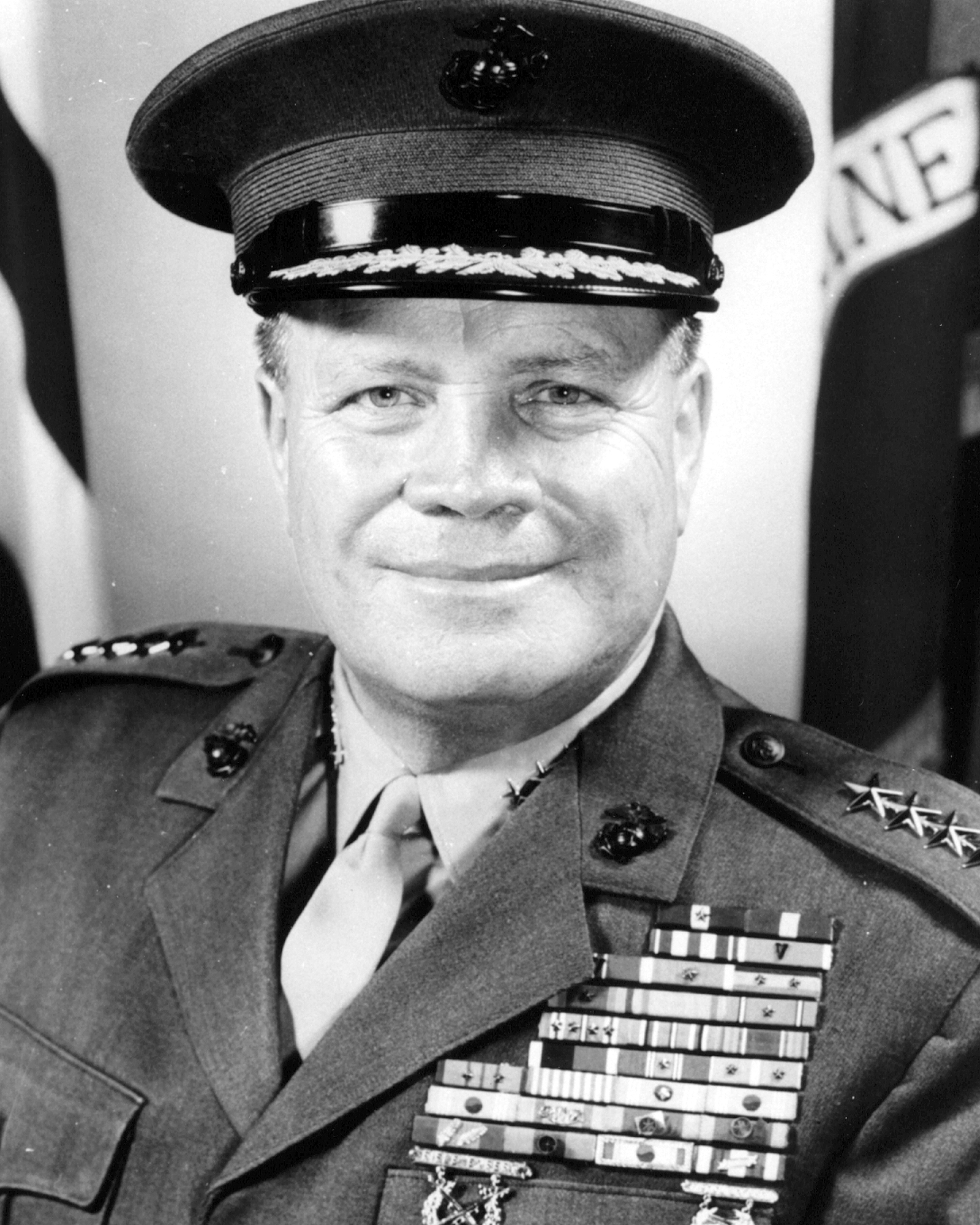
- Walt as a General
- Born: February 16, 1913; Wabaunsee County, Kansas, U.S.
- Died: March 26, 1989 (aged 76); Gulfport, Mississippi, U.S.
- Burial place: Quantico National Cemetery
- Military career
- Allegiance: United States
- Branch: United States Marine Corps
- Service years: 1930–1936 (Colorado National Guard); 1936–1971 (USMC)
- Rank: General
- Nicknames: Lew; Silent Lew; Uncle Lew
- Commands: 2nd Battalion 5th Marines; 3rd Battalion, 5th Marines; 5th Marine Regiment; The Basic School; 3rd Marine Division; Assistant Commandant of the Marine Corps (1968–1971)
- Conflicts: World War II; Tulagi; Battle of Guadalcanal; Battle of Cape Gloucester; Battle of Peleliu; Korean War; Vietnam War
- Awards: Navy Cross (2); Distinguished Service Medal (2); Silver Star Medal; Legion of Merit with Combat "V"; Bronze Star Medal with Combat "V"; Purple Heart Medal (2); Combat Action Ribbon (3)

Lewis William Walt (February 16, 1913 – March 26, 1989) was a United States Marine Corps four-star general who served in World War II, the Korean War, and the Vietnam War. Walt was decorated several times, including two awards of the Navy Cross, for extraordinary heroism during World War II, the first for leading the attack on "Aogiri Ridge" during the Battle of Cape Gloucester (New Britain); the ridge was later on renamed "Walt's Ridge" in his honor.

== Early life ==
Lewis William Walt was born on February 16, 1913, in Wabaunsee County, Kansas. He graduated from high school in Fort Collins, Colorado. He earned a Bachelor of Science degree in chemistry at Colorado State University in 1936. Highlights of his student activities include: honor graduate, president of student body and student council, captain of football team and wrestling team, cadet colonel of the ROTC, president of chemistry club and captain of Scabbard and Blade.

== Military career ==
Walt enlisted in the Colorado National Guard at the age of 17. Upon graduation, he was commissioned a second lieutenant in the Army Field Artillery Reserve, but resigned that commission to accept an appointment as a Marine second lieutenant on July 6, 1936.

Lieutenant Walt completed The Basic School at Philadelphia, and in April 1937 was assigned to the 6th Marine Regiment in San Diego, California, as a machine gun platoon leader. Embarking for China in August 1937, he took part in the defense of the International Settlement of Shanghai until February 1938, at which time he returned to San Diego. In June 1939, he began his second tour of overseas duty when he was assigned to the Marine Barracks, Guam, Mariana Islands. He was promoted to first lieutenant in October 1939.

Returning to the United States in June 1941, shortly before his country's entry into World War II, he was assigned as a company commander in the Officer Candidates' Class, Marine Corps Schools, Quantico, Virginia. He was promoted to captain in December 1941.

His first marriage to Nancy Mary Sheehan, an army nurse he met in World War II, ended in divorce. He was survived by his second wife, June Burkett Jacobsen Walt, and two sons and a daughter by his first marriage, Lewis W. Walt Jr., Lawrence C. Walt and Mary K. Martin.

=== World War II ===
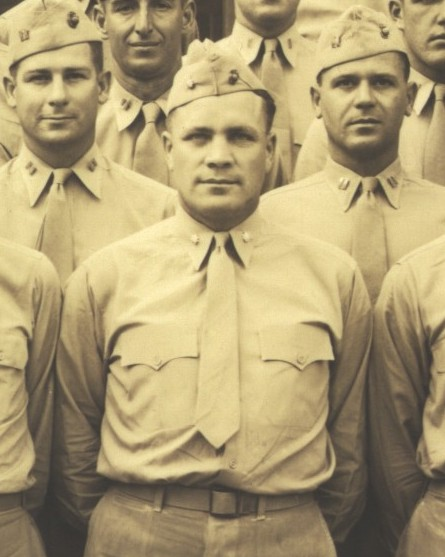
Official USMC photo showing Lew Walt at Quantico, Virginia, ca. 1945.

Early in 1942, Walt volunteered to join the 1st Marine Raider Battalion, and in April 1942 arrived with the battalion on Samoa. On August 7, 1942, as commander of Company A, 1st Raider Battalion, he landed his company in the assault on Tulagi Island in the British Solomon Islands. He was awarded the Silver Star Medal for conspicuous gallantry during this landing. Following this action, he joined the 5th Marines on Guadalcanal, where he took part in combat as commanding officer of the 2nd Battalion, 5th Marines. He was promoted to major in September 1942.

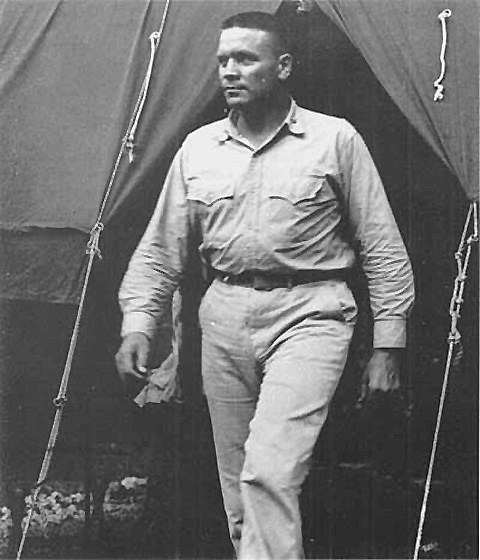
Lieutenant Colonel Lew Walt earned the Navy Cross leading an attack up Aogiri Ridge, renamed Walt's Ridge in his honor.

In October 1942, as battalion commander, 5th Marines, 1st Marine Division, Walt was wounded in action but continued in combat. On December 22, 1942, he was spot promoted to lieutenant colonel for distinguished leadership and gallantry in action during the Guadalcanal campaign.

In December 1943, following hospitalization and training in Australia, Walt led the 2nd Battalion, 5th Marines, in the assault at Cape Gloucester, New Britain, and shortly thereafter was assigned as Regimental Executive Officer. In the middle of this campaign he was ordered to take over command of the 3rd Battalion, 5th Marines, during the intense battle for Aogiri Ridge. During this action, he earned his first Navy Cross and Aogiri Ridge was named "Walt Ridge" in his honor by General Lemuel C. Shepherd, Jr., 1st Marine Division assistant commander. Departing Cape Gloucester in late February 1944, Walt was ordered to the Naval Hospital, Oakland, California, for treatment of wounds and malaria.

In June 1944, he returned to the Pacific theater. That September, he landed with the Marine force on Peleliu as Regimental Executive Officer, 5th Marines. On the first day of the battle, he was again ordered to take command of 3rd Battalion, 5th Marines after the battalion's commanding officer and executive officer became casualties. After nightfall on the first day of the battle, three of the battalion's companies had failed to make contact with the command post and their exact whereabouts were unknown. At great risk to himself, Walt ventured out into enemy-infested territory in the dark of night, accompanied by one Marine, and proceeded to locate the missing companies and direct them to their correct position along the divisional line. For these actions, Lieutenant Colonel Walt was awarded his second Navy Cross for gallantry in action.

In November 1944, Walt returned to the United States, and the following month assumed duty at Marine Corps Schools, Quantico, as Chief of the Marine Officer Candidates' School Tactics Section.

=== Post-World War II ===
Assigned to Camp Pendleton in January 1947, he served as assistant chief of staff, G-3, 3rd Marine Brigade, and then as G-3, 1st Marine Division. In November 1947, he assumed duty as operations and training officer, 1st Provisional Marine Brigade on Guam, and later served as Chief of Staff of that organization from February to April 1949. Returning to Marine Corps Schools, Quantico, in May 1949, he saw duty as a battalion commander with the Special Training Regiment; and in September, he entered the Amphibious Warfare School, Senior Course. On completing the course in June 1950, he remained at Marine Corps Schools to serve as chief of Tactics Section, S-3, and finally, executive officer, The Basic School. He was promoted to colonel in November 1951.

=== Korean War ===
Colonel Walt was ordered to South Korea in November 1952, where he was in combat with the 1st Marine Division until August 1953, serving consecutively as commanding officer, 5th Marines, assistant chief of staff, G-3, and chief of staff of the division. He received both the Legion of Merit with Combat "V" for Valor and the Bronze Star Medal with Combat "V" for Valor, for exceptionally meritorious service during this assignment. The Republic of Korea government also awarded Walt the Ulchi Medal and the Ulchi Medal with Silver Star for this period of service.

=== Post-Korea ===
On arrival at Marine Corps Schools, Quantico, in August 1953, he saw duty as director, Advanced Base Problem Section, Marine Corps Educational Center, through May 1954, followed by duty as commanding officer, Officers' Basic School, until August 1956. He also served as a Member of the Advanced Research Group, Marine Corps Educational Center, until June 1957.

Transferred to Washington, D.C., Walt served as assistant director of personnel until August 1959, then entered the National War College, Washington, D.C.. He completed the course in June 1960.

In July 1960, he began a one-year assignment as Marine Corps representative on the Joint Advanced Study Group of the Joint Chiefs of Staff. Upon completing this assignment, he was promoted to brigadier general and reported for duty at Camp Lejeune as assistant division commander, 2nd Marine Division. In September 1962, Walt returned to Marine Corps Schools, Quantico, serving as director of the Marine Corps Landing Force Development Center there until May 1965.

=== Vietnam War ===
In May 1965, Walt was promoted to major general, and in June 1965 assumed command of III Marine Amphibious Force and 3rd Marine Division in South Vietnam. He was also chief of naval forces, Vietnam and senior advisor, I Corps and I Corps coordinator, Republic of Vietnam.

Ten months later, President Lyndon B. Johnson nominated Walt for lieutenant general. The Senate confirmed his promotion on March 7, 1966.

He continued in Vietnam as commanding general, III Marine Amphibious Force, and senior advisor, I Corps and I Corps Coordinator, Republic of Vietnam. During this period, the Secretary of the Navy awarded Walt his first Distinguished Service Medal. In addition, the Vietnamese government awarded him the Vietnamese National Order, 3rd Class; the Vietnamese National Order, 4th Class; the Gallantry Cross with Palm; the Chuong My Medal, and the Vietnamese Armed Forces Meritorious Unit Citation of Gallantry Cross with Palm. The Government of South Korea also awarded Walt the senior Ulchi Medal.

As a testament to his vital role in Vietnam, Life magazine featured Walt in a May 1967 cover story. The article noted the success of an innovative program initiated by Walt in August 1965 called the Combined Action Program (CAP). This program consisted of squads of Marine and Navy medical corpsmen volunteers for combined action platoons (CAP), that were part of combined action companies (CAC), combined with South Vietnamese Popular Force platoons, which were sent into South Vietnamese countryside villages and hamlets to deny the Viet Cong access to the people living there. As Life noted, "His CAC units all had the same orders: help protect the villages, get to know the people, find the local Communist infrastructure and put it out of business." Walt stressed the importance of using combined action companies to win the confidence of average, ordinary Vietnamese citizens. The magazine observed, "If these people could be located and won over, Walt argued, the Communists would be hit where it hurts." Because of the Combined Action Program, the number of "secure" villages under Walt's protection rose between 1965 and 1967 from 87 to 197, while the number of Vietnamese living in "secure" areas in general rose from 413,000 to 1.1 million.

=== Assistant commandant ===
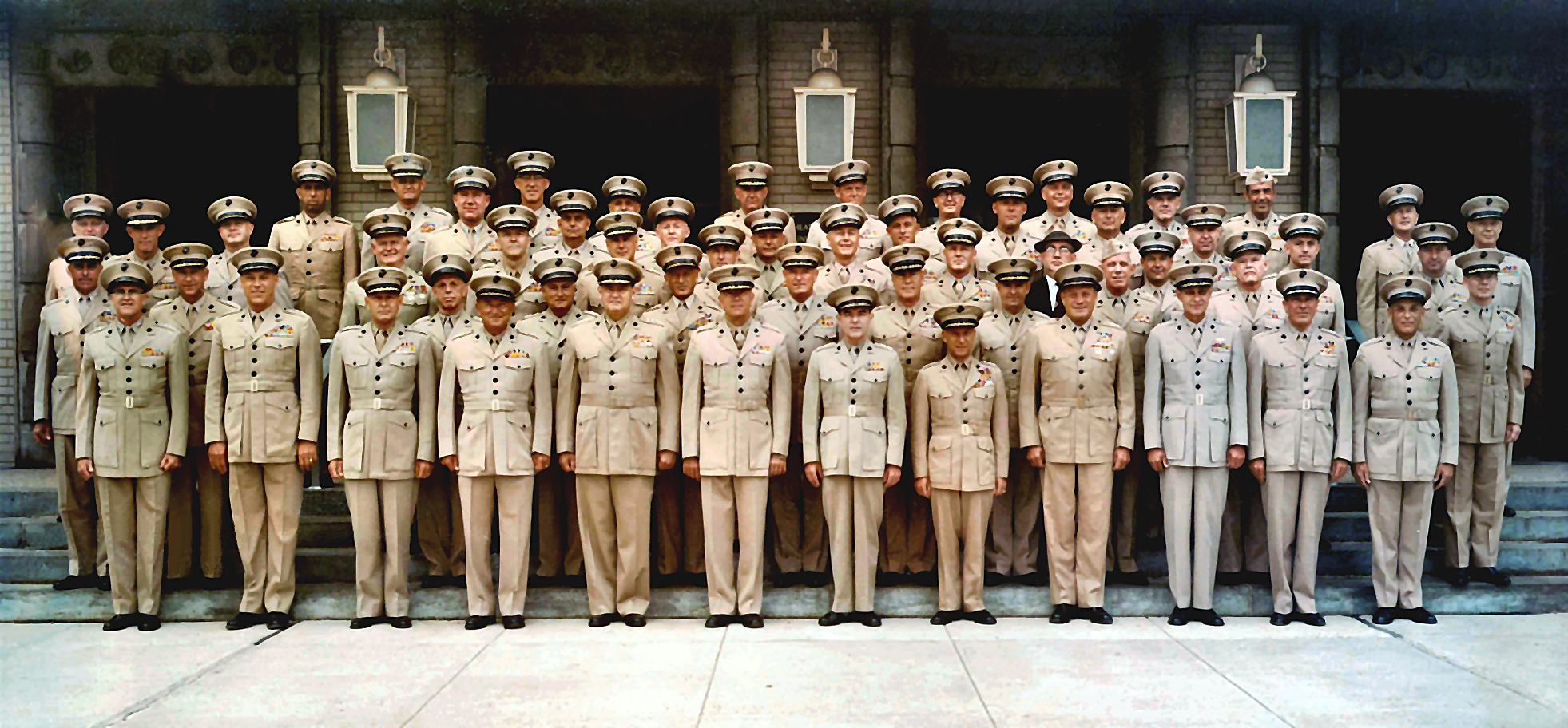
Walt (4th from right, front row) at the 1967 General Officers Symposium

Upon his return to the United States, he saw duty from June 1967 until the following December as deputy chief of staff (manpower)/director of personnel, at Headquarters Marine Corps. On January 1, 1968, he was designated Assistant Commandant of the Marine Corps.

In April 1969, the Senate passed and sent to the White House a bill to make the assistant commandant of the Marine Corps a four-star general when the active duty strength of the Marine Corps exceeded 200,000. On May 5, President Richard M. Nixon signed the bill, and Walt was promoted to four-star rank on June 2, 1969, thus becoming the first assistant commandant of the Marine Corps to attain that rank.

While visiting the Taiwan Defense Command in April 1970, Walt was presented the Order of the Cloud and Banner with Grand Cordon, by General Kao Kuei-yuan of the Republic of China. Presented by the chief of the General Staff, the citation recognized the Assistant Commandant's "exceptionally meritorious conduct in the performance of outstanding service to the Chinese Marine Corps." The citation noted that Walt had "contributed immensely in the furtherance of military cooperation and traditional friendship between the United States of America and the Republic of China."

== Retirement ==
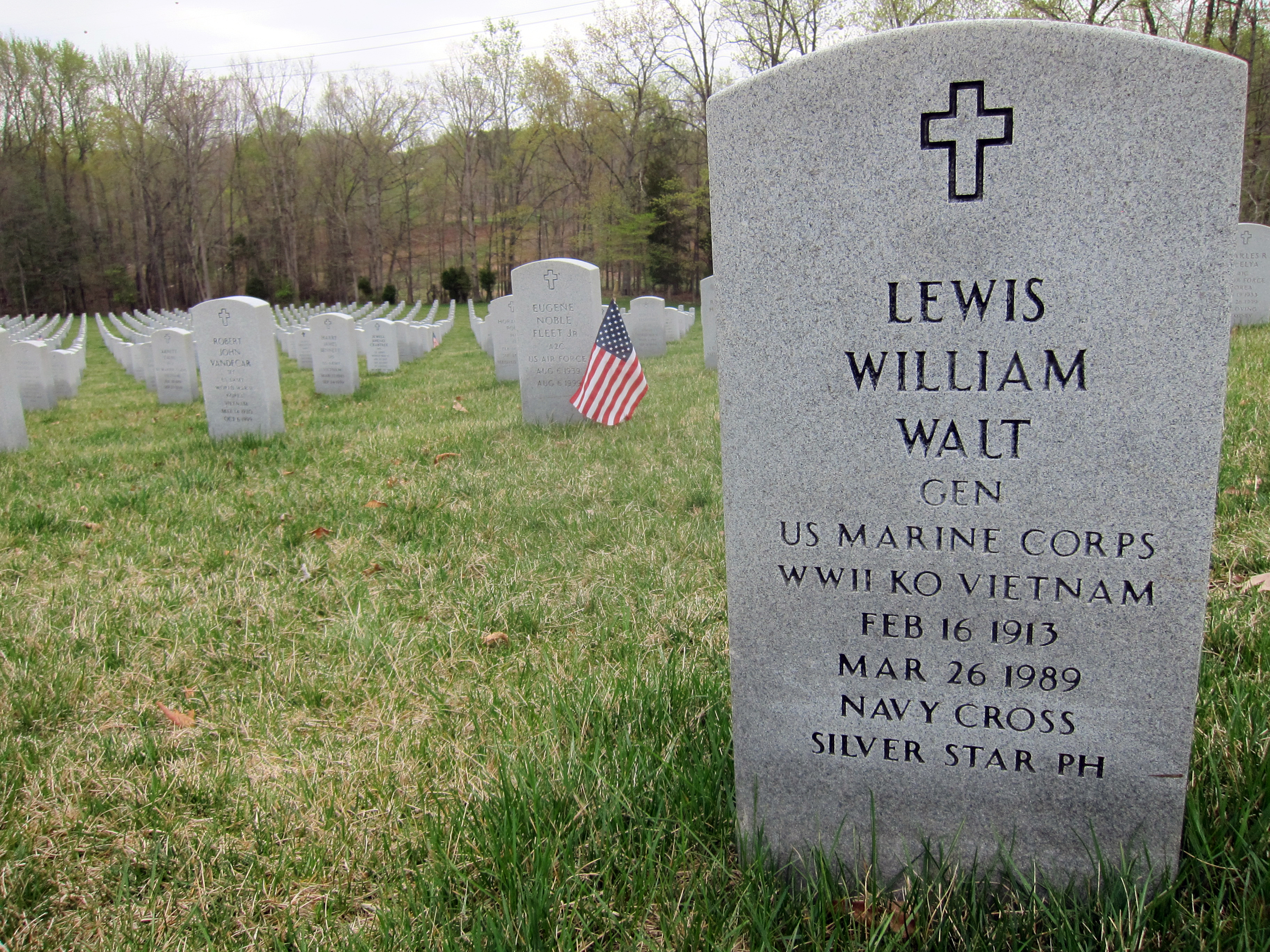
Headstone in Quantico National Cemetery

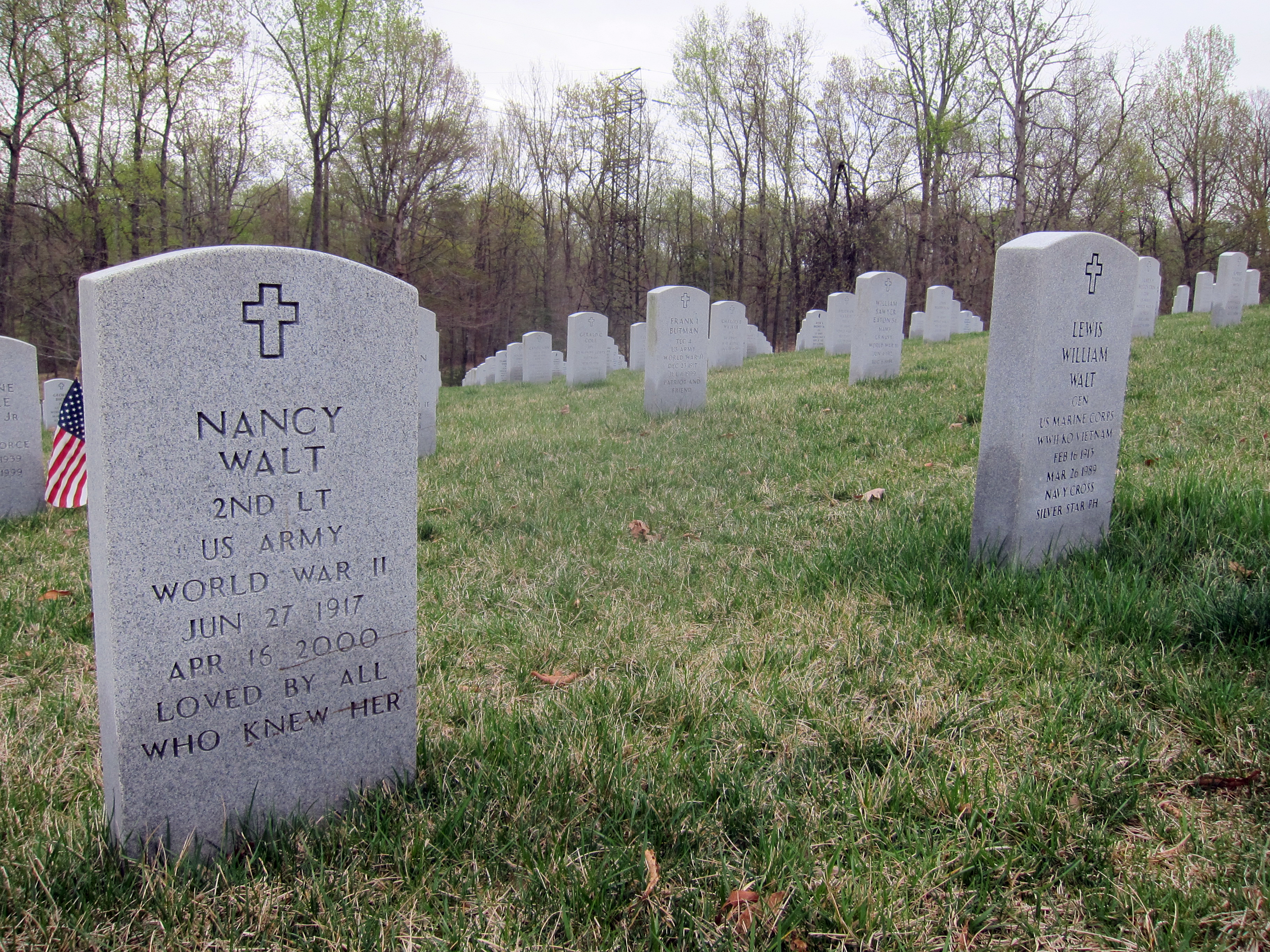
Walt's second wife Nancy is interred at his side in Quantico National Cemetery

Walt retired from active duty on February 1, 1971, and subsequently served as director of the United States Marines Youth Foundation. He later coordinated a U.S. Senate investigation on international drug trafficking.

In the mid-1970s he served as the senior military member of President Gerald Ford's clemency board, and later advised the Department of Defense on weapons development and combat training. Walt described the contradictions of the Vietnam War in an article for The New York Times in 1971. "On the one hand it was an extremely sophisticated war, with complex weapons unlike even World War II or Korea," he wrote. "On the other hand it was a return to medieval war, pitting man against man on a battleground where only the courageous could win."

Walt wrote three books after retiring from the Marine Corps: Strange War, Strange Strategy, about the war in Vietnam; America Faces Defeat, about the dangers confronting the nation; and The Eleventh Hour, about the urgency of the nation's problems.

== Death ==
Walt died on March 26, 1989, at a retirement home in Gulfport, Mississippi, after a long illness, and is buried in Quantico National Cemetery.

== Military awards ==
His military decorations and awards include:

1st Row		Navy Cross w/ 5/16" Gold Star	Navy Distinguished Service Medal w/ 5/16" Gold Star	
2nd Row	Silver Star Medal	Legion of Merit w/ Combat "V"	Bronze Star Medal w/ Combat "V"	Purple Heart Medal w/ 5/16" Gold Star
3rd Row	Presidential Unit Citation (Navy) w/ two 3/16" Bronze Stars	Navy Unit Commendation w/ 3/16" Bronze Star	China Service Medal	American Defense Service Medal w/ Base clasp (3/16" Bronze Star)
4th Row	American Campaign Medal	Asiatic-Pacific Campaign Medal w/ four 3/16" Bronze Stars	World War II Victory Medal	Navy Occupation Service Medal w/ Asia clasp
5th Row	National Defense Service Medal w/ 3/16" Bronze Star	Korean Service Medal w/ two 3/16" Bronze Stars	Vietnam Service Medal w/ four 3/16" Bronze Stars	Order of the Cloud and Banner (w/ Grand Cordon)
6th Row	Order of Military Merit, Eulji Medal w/ Silver Star	Order of Military Merit, Eulji Medal	Order of Military Merit, Chungmu Medal	Order of National Security Merit (Korea), Gugseon Medal
7th Row	National Order of Vietnam, Commander	National Order of Vietnam, Officer	Republic of Vietnam Gallantry Cross w/ two Palms	Choung My Medal 1st class
8th Row	Republic of Korea Presidential Unit Citation	Republic of Vietnam Meritorious Unit Citation (Gallantry Cross) w/ Palm and Frame	United Nations Korea Medal	Vietnam Campaign Medal

=== First Navy Cross citation ===
Citation:

The President of the United States of America takes pleasure in presenting the Navy Cross to Lieutenant Colonel Lewis William Walt (MCSN: 0-5436), United States Marine Corps, for extraordinary heroism while attached to the Third Battalion, Fifth Marines (Reinforced), FIRST Marine Division, in action against enemy Japanese forces in the Borgen Bay Area, Cape Gloucester, New Britain, on 10 January 1944. When all six members of a 37-mm. gun crew were killed or wounded while moving the weapon up the steep slope of a ridge to provide support for advanced assault units pinned down by heavy enemy fire, Lieutenant Colonel Walt unhesitatingly rushed forward alone and, completely disregarding his own personal safety, began to push the gun up the hill. Inspired by his initiative and valor, several other men came to his assistance and laboriously worked their way up the slope in the face of terrific hostile fire until the gun was in position to enfilade the enemy lines. Courageously leading his men against five counterattacks made by the Japanese during the night in an effort to regain control of one end of the ridge, Lieutenant Colonel Walt enabled his forces to repulse the attacks with great losses to the enemy and, resuming the battle the next morning, skillfully directed the battalion in the capture of the entire ridge. By his brilliant leadership and expert tactical knowledge, Lieutenant Colonel Walt contributed materially to the success of our forces in this area and upheld the highest traditions of the United States Naval Service.

=== Second Navy Cross citation ===
Citation:

The President of the United States of America takes pleasure in presenting a Gold Star in lieu of a Second Award of the Navy Cross to Lieutenant Colonel Lewis William Walt (MCSN: 0-5436), United States Marine Corps, for extraordinary heroism as Executive Officer of the Fifth Marines, FIRST Marine Division, during operations against enemy Japanese forces on Peleliu, Palau Islands, from 15 to 30 September 1944. When the Commanding Officer of the Third Battalion was wounded and the Executive Officer killed during an engagement with the enemy in thick jungle on the evening of 15 September, Lieutenant Colonel Walt assumed command of the Battalion and, by his aggressive and tireless leadership in the face of hostile small-arms, mortar and artillery fire, reorganized the Battalion and enabled it to repulse a heavy Japanese counterattack during the night and push forward to its objective the following morning. On the morning of 20 September, as Regimental Executive Officer, he made his way to the northern tip of the island to direct the installation of a gun and, although under heavy sniper and machine-gun fire, remained at the gun and supervised the firing on a cave until this strong point was neutralized. His courage and inspiring leadership throughout were in keeping with the highest traditions of the United States Naval Service.

=== Silver Star citation ===
Citation:

The President of the United States of America takes pleasure in presenting the Silver Star to Captain Lewis William Walt (MCSN: 0-5436), United States Marine Corps, for conspicuous gallantry and intrepidity while commanding an assault company of the First Marine Raider Battalion during action against enemy Japanese forces on Tulagi, Solomon Islands, 7 August 1942. Exercising keen judgment and distinctive leadership, Captain Walt, with complete disregard for his own safety, directed the attack by his company on a strongly entrenched and cleverly concealed Japanese force, ultimately compelling the enemy to retire. In the same action, observing that several men of his assault force were seriously wounded by hostile fire, Captain Walk, although he, himself, was exposed to intense machine gun and sniper fire, rushed forward and personally dragged two of his men to cover, thereby saving their lives. His inspiring heroism was in keeping with the highest traditions of the United States Naval Service.

== See also ==
- Battle of Cape Gloucester
