= Bell–Boeing V-22 Osprey =

Military transport tiltrotor

V-22 Osprey
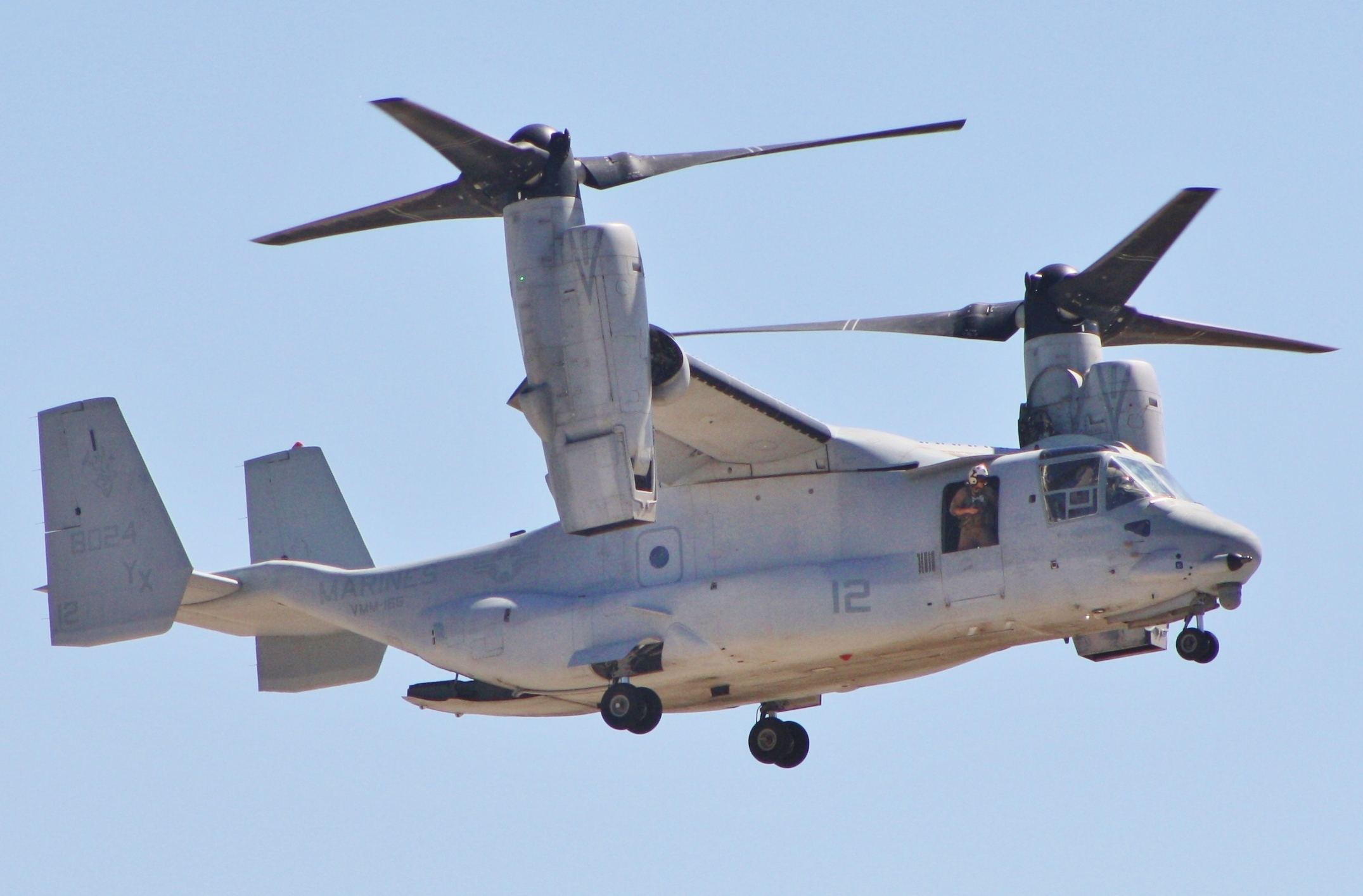
- An MV-22 being used during an MAGTF demonstration during the 2014 Miramar Air Show

General information
- Type: Tiltrotor military transport aircraft
- National origin: United States
- Manufacturer: Bell Helicopter; Boeing Defense, Space & Security
- Status: In service
- Primary users: United States Marine Corps: United States Air Force; United States Navy; Japan Ground Self-Defense Force
- Number built: 400 as of 2020

History
- Manufactured: 1988–present
- Introduction date: 13 June 2007
- First flight: 19 March 1989
- Developed from: Bell XV-15
- Variant: Bell Boeing Quad TiltRotor

The Bell Boeing V-22 Osprey is an American multi-use, tiltrotor military transport and cargo aircraft with both vertical takeoff and landing (VTOL) and short takeoff and landing (STOL) capabilities. As the first production aircraft of its type, it is designed to combine the functionality of a conventional helicopter with the long-range, high-speed cruise performance of a turboprop aircraft, and is operated by the United States and Japan. It first flew in 1989, and after a long development was fielded in 2007.

The failure of Operation Eagle Claw in 1980 during the Iran hostage crisis underscored that there were military roles for which neither conventional helicopters nor fixed-wing transport aircraft were well-suited. The United States Department of Defense (DoD) initiated a program to develop an innovative transport aircraft with long-range, high-speed, and vertical-takeoff capabilities, and the Joint-service Vertical take-off/landing Experimental (JVX) program officially began in 1981. A partnership between Bell Helicopter and Boeing Helicopters was awarded a development contract in 1983 for the V-22 tiltrotor aircraft. The Bell-Boeing team jointly produces the aircraft. The V-22 first flew in 1989 and began flight testing and design alterations; the complexity and difficulties of being the first tiltrotor for military service led to many years of development. The Osprey has been involved in a number of accidents that have raised concerns.

The United States Marine Corps (USMC) began crew training for the MV-22B Osprey in 2000 and fielded it in 2007; it supplemented and then replaced their Boeing Vertol CH-46 Sea Knights. The U.S. Air Force (USAF) fielded its version of the tiltrotor, the CV-22B, in 2009. Since entering service with the Marine Corps and Air Force, the Osprey has been deployed in transportation and medevac operations over Iraq, Afghanistan, Libya, and Kuwait. The U.S. Navy began using the CMV-22B for carrier onboard delivery duties in 2021.

== Development ==
=== Origins ===
The failure of Operation Eagle Claw, the Iran hostage rescue mission, in 1980 demonstrated to the U.S. military a need for "a new type of aircraft, that could not only take off and land vertically but also could carry combat troops, and do so at speed." Additionally, a concentrated force is vulnerable to a single nuclear weapon. Airborne solutions with high speed and range allow for their rapid dispersal to reduce this vulnerability. The U.S. Department of Defense began the JVX aircraft program in 1981, under U.S. Army leadership.

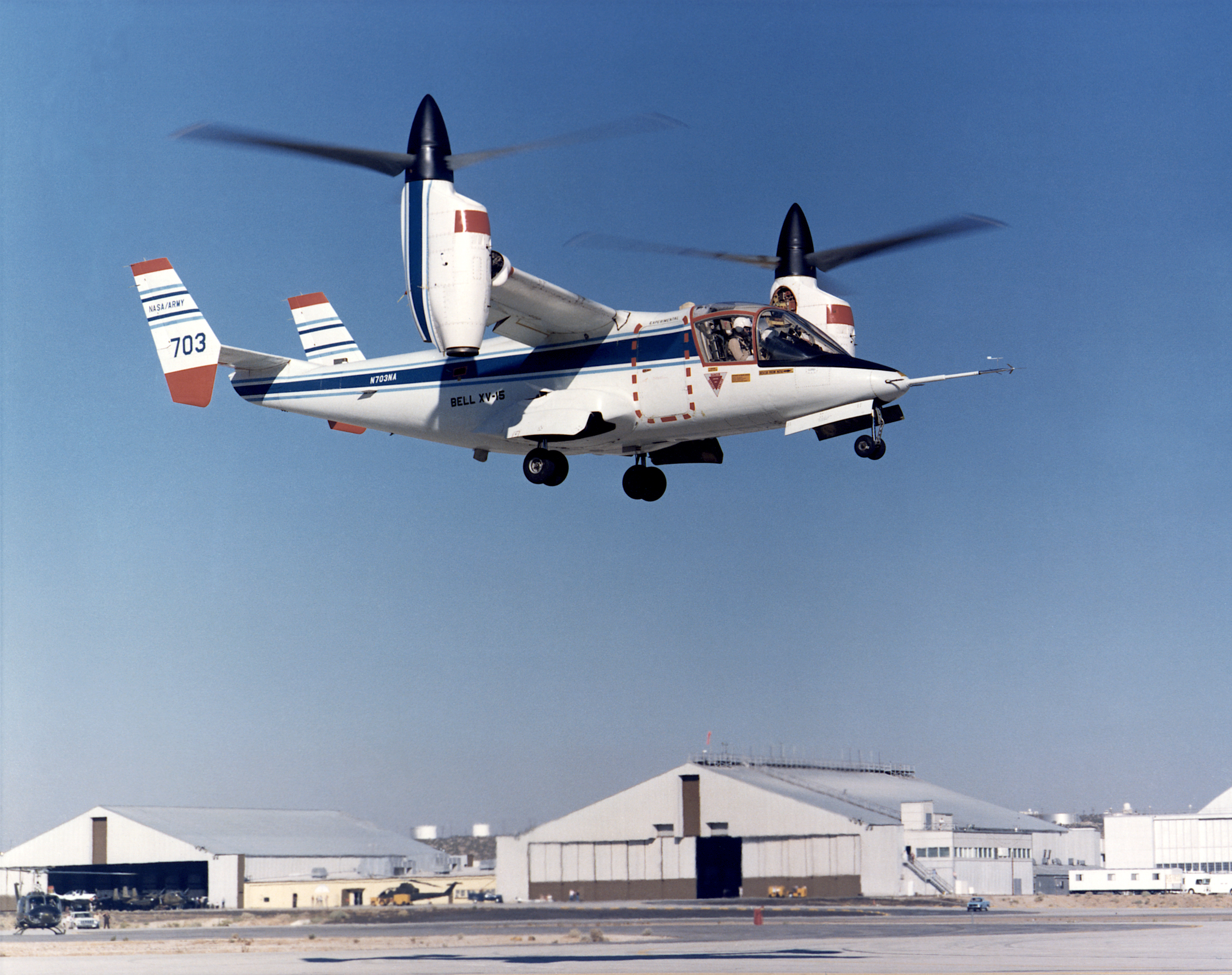
XV-15 experimental tiltrotor, 1980

The established tactical purpose of the USMC is to perform an amphibious landing, which the JVX program promised to facilitate. The USMC's primary helicopter model, the CH-46 Sea Knight, was aging, and no replacement had been accepted. Because the USMC's amphibious capability would be significantly reduced without the CH-46, USMC leadership believed a proposal to merge the Marine Corps with the Army was a credible threat. This potential merger was akin to a proposal by President Truman following World War II. The Office of the Secretary of Defense and Navy administration opposed the tiltrotor project, but pressure from Congress had a significant effect on the program's development.

The Navy and USMC were given the lead in 1983. The JVX combined requirements from the USMC, USAF, Army and Navy. A request for preliminary design proposals was issued in December 1982. Interest was expressed by Aérospatiale, Bell Helicopter, Boeing Vertol, Grumman, Lockheed, and Westland. Contractors were encouraged to form teams. Bell partnered with Boeing Vertol to submit a proposal for an enlarged version of the Bell XV-15 prototype on 17 February 1983. Since this was the only proposal the JVX program received, a preliminary design contract was awarded on 26 April 1983.

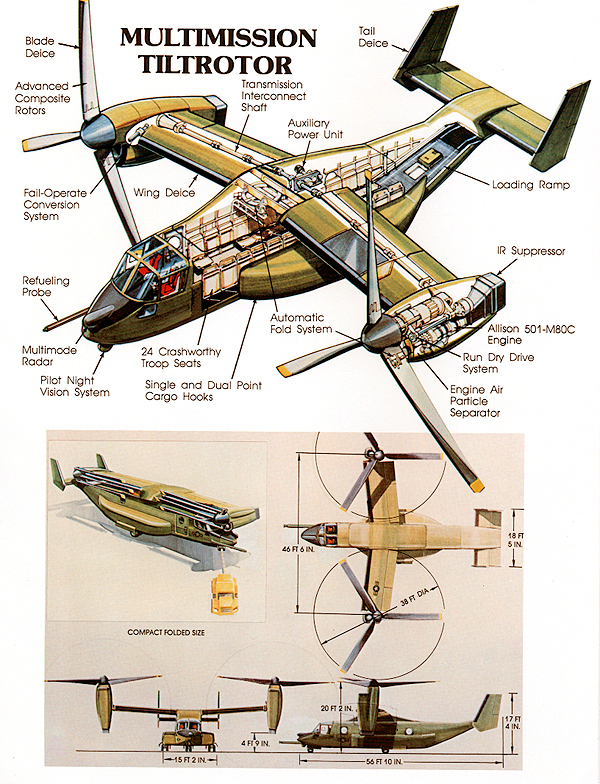
Early concept illustrations

The JVX aircraft was designated V-22 Osprey on 15 January 1985; by that March, the first six prototypes were being produced, and Boeing Vertol was expanded to handle the workload. Production work is split between Bell and Boeing. Bell Helicopter manufactures and integrates the wing, nacelles, rotors, drive system, tail surfaces, and aft ramp, as well as integrating the Rolls-Royce engines and performing final assembly. Boeing Helicopters manufactures and integrates the fuselage, cockpit, avionics, and flight controls. The USMC variant received the MV-22 designation, and the USAF variant received CV-22; this was reversed from normal procedure to prevent USMC Ospreys from having a conflicting CV designation with aircraft carriers. Full-scale development began in 1986. On 3 May 1986, Bell Boeing was awarded a US$1.714 billion contract for the V-22 by the U.S. Navy. At this point, all four U.S. military services had acquisition plans for the V-22.

The first V-22 was publicly rolled out in May 1988. That year, the U.S. Army left the program, citing a need to focus its budget on more immediate aviation programs. In 1989, the V-22 survived two separate Senate votes that could have resulted in cancellation. Despite the Senate's decision, the Department of Defense instructed the Navy not to spend more money on the V-22. As development cost projections greatly increased in 1988, Defense Secretary Dick Cheney tried to defund it from 1989 to 1992, but was overruled by Congress, which provided unrequested program funding. Multiple studies of alternatives found the V-22 provided more capability and effectiveness with similar operating costs. The Clinton Administration was supportive of the V-22, helping it attain funding.

Although the Army departed the program, it eventually developed and chose a tiltrotor to replace the UH-60 Blackhawk in the 21st century, and as of the mid-2020s the Army is planning to field the V-280 Valor tiltrotor.

=== Flight testing and design changes ===
The first of six prototypes first flew on 19 March 1989 in the helicopter mode and on 14 September 1989 in fixed-wing mode. The third and fourth prototypes successfully completed the first sea trials on USS Wasp in December 1990. The fourth and fifth prototypes crashed in 1991–92. From October 1992 to April 1993, the V-22 was redesigned to reduce empty weight, simplify manufacture, and reduce build costs; it was designated V-22B. Flights resumed in June 1993 after safety changes were made to the prototypes. Bell Boeing received a contract for the engineering manufacturing development (EMD) phase in June 1994. The prototypes were also modified to resemble the V-22B standard. At this stage, testing focused on flight envelope expansion, measuring flight loads, and supporting the EMD redesign. Flight testing with the early V-22s continued into 1997.

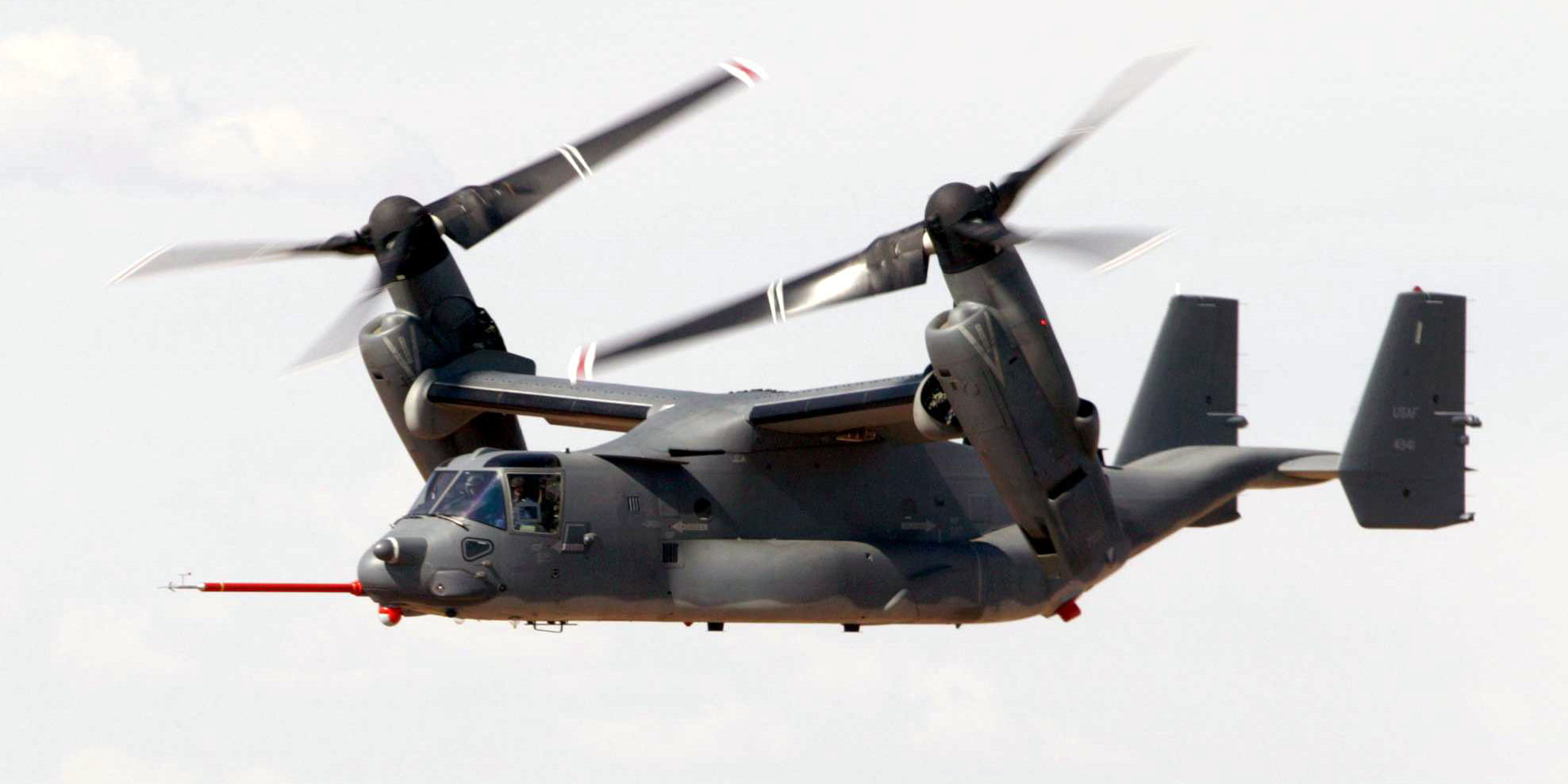
A V-22 during tests in 2003

Flight testing of four full-scale development V-22s began at the Naval Air Warfare Test Center, Naval Air Station Patuxent River, Maryland. The first EMD flight took place on 5 February 1997. Testing soon fell behind schedule. The first of four low rate initial production aircraft, ordered on 28 April 1997, was delivered on 27 May 1999. The second sea trials were completed onboard USS Saipan in January 1999. During external load testing in April 1999, a V-22 transported the lightweight M777 howitzer.

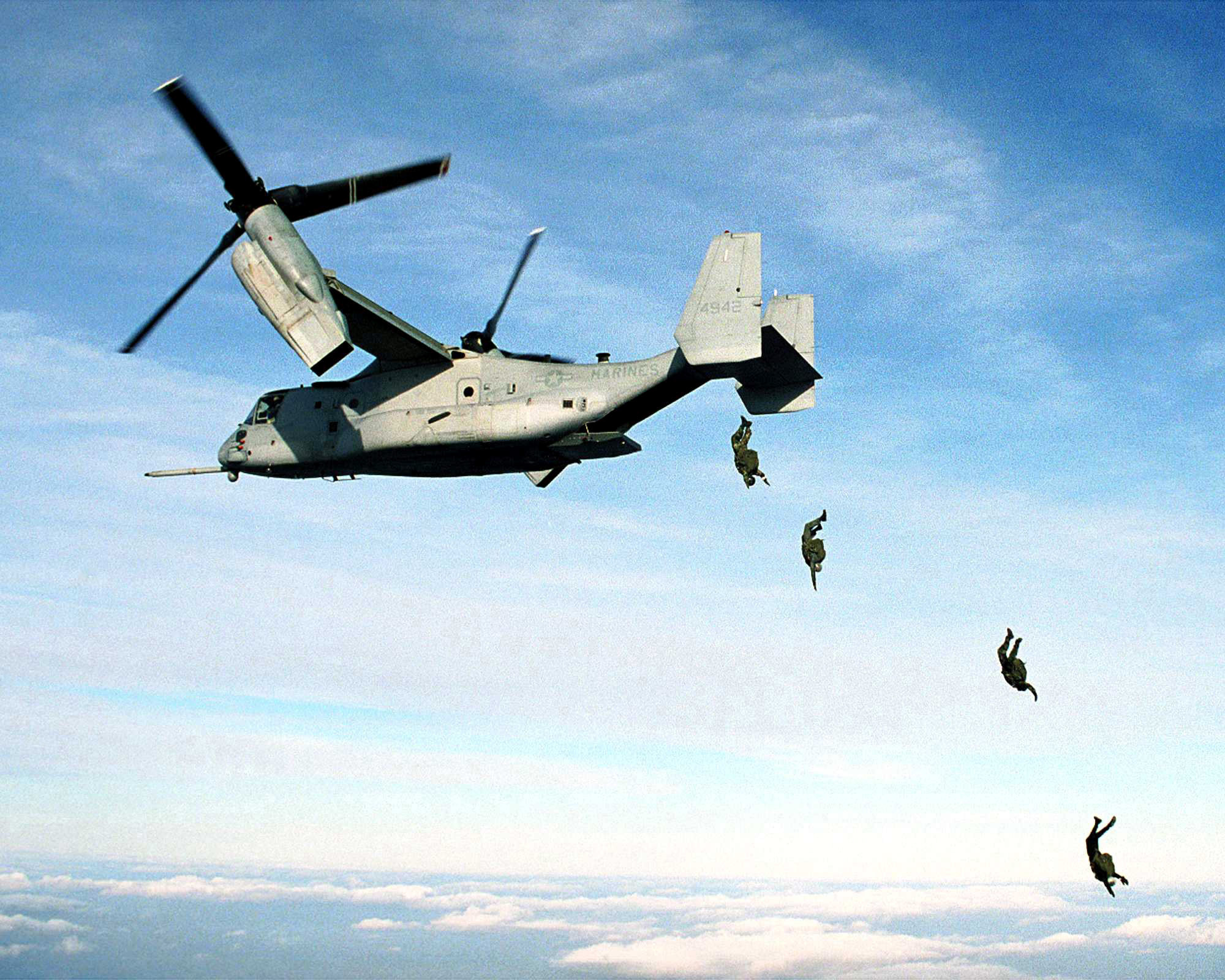
U.S. Marines jump from an Osprey.

In 2000, there were two fatal crashes, killing a total of 23 marines, and the V-22 was again grounded while the crashes' causes were investigated and various parts were redesigned. In June 2005, the V-22 completed its final operational evaluation, including long-range deployments, high altitude, desert and shipboard operations; problems previously identified had reportedly been resolved.

U.S. Naval Air Systems Command (NAVAIR) worked on software upgrades to increase the maximum speed from 250 to 270 knots (460 to 500 km/h; 290 to 310 mph), increase helicopter mode altitude limit from 10,000 to 12,000 feet (3,000 to 3,700 m) or 14,000 feet (4,300 m), and increase lift performance. By 2012, changes had been made to the hardware, software, and procedures in response to hydraulic fires in the nacelles, vortex ring state control issues, and opposed landings; reliability has improved accordingly.

An MV-22 landed and refueled on board Nimitz in an evaluation in October 2012. In 2013, cargo handling trials occurred on Harry S. Truman. In October 2015, NAVAIR tested rolling landings and takeoffs on a carrier, preparing for carrier onboard delivery.

=== Discussions ===
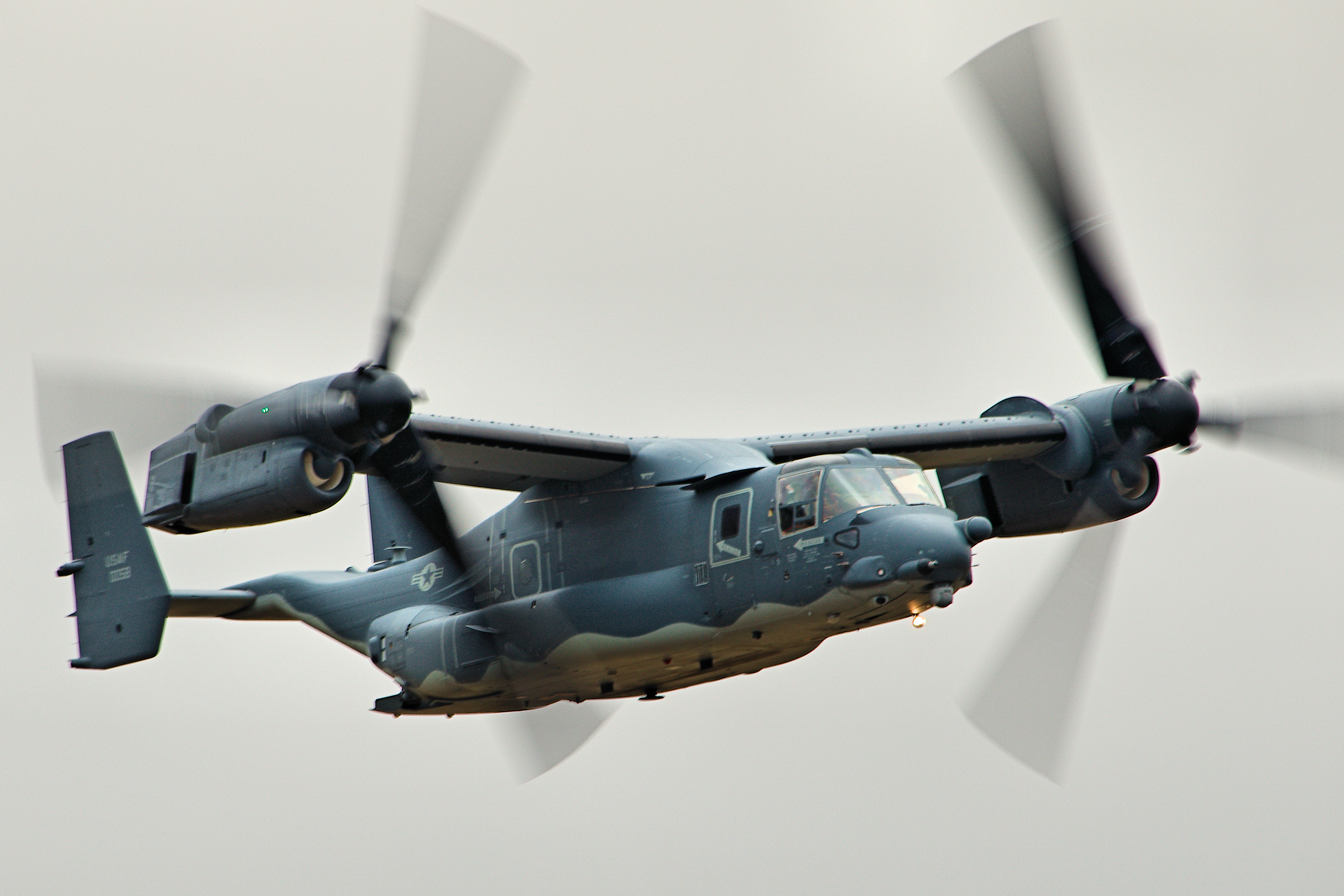
CV-22 at RIAT 2017

Development was protracted and controversial, partly because of large cost increases, some of which were caused by a requirement to fold wings and rotors to fit aboard ships. The development budget was first set at US$2.5 billion in 1986, increasing to a projected US$30 billion in 1988. By 2008, US$27 billion had been spent and another US$27.2 billion was required for planned production numbers. Between 2008 and 2011, the V-22's estimated lifetime cost grew by 61%, mostly for maintenance and support.

Its [The V-22's] production costs are considerably greater than for helicopters with equivalent capability – specifically, about twice as great as for the CH-53E, which has a greater payload and an ability to carry heavy equipment the V-22 cannot ... an Osprey unit would cost around $60 million to produce, and $35 million for the helicopter equivalent.

— Michael E. O'Hanlon, 2002

In 2001, Lieutenant Colonel Odin Leberman, commander of the V-22 squadron at Marine Corps Air Station New River, was relieved of duty after allegations that he instructed his unit to falsify maintenance records to make it appear more reliable. Three officers were implicated for their roles in the falsification scandal.

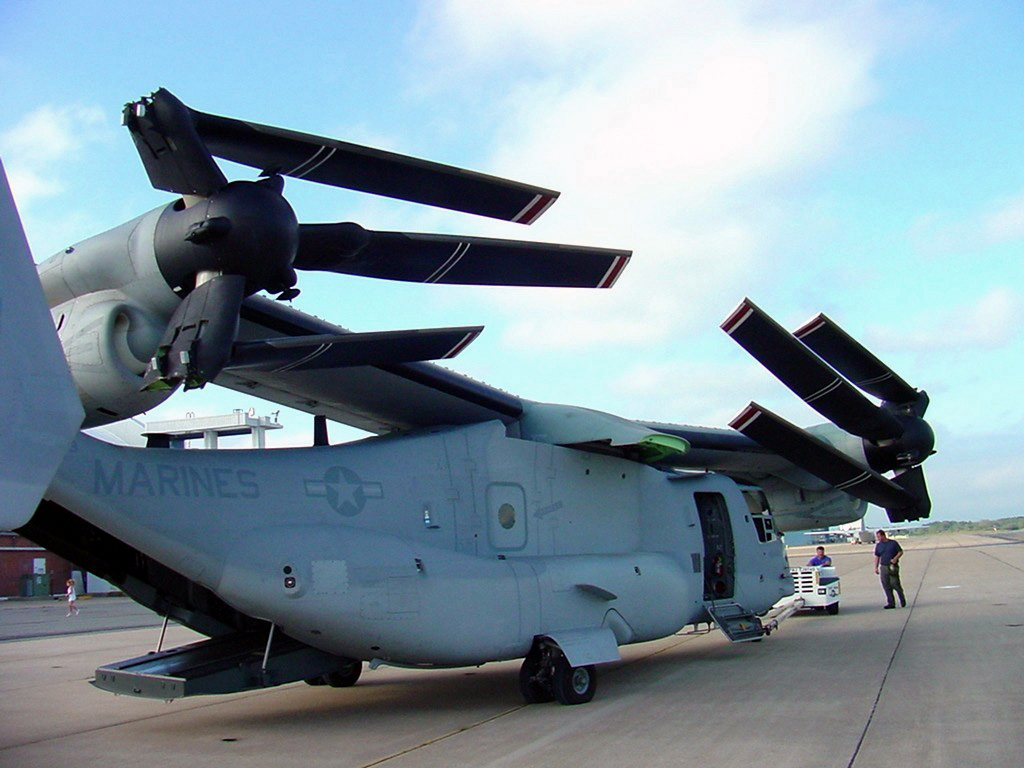
A V-22 in a compact storage configuration during the Navy's evaluation, 2002

In October 2007, a Time magazine article condemned the V-22 as unsafe, overpriced, and inadequate; the USMC responded that the article's data was partly obsolete, inaccurate, and held high expectations for any new field of aircraft. In 2011, the controversial defense industry-supported Lexington Institute reported that the average mishap rate per flight hour over the past 10 years was the lowest of any USMC rotorcraft, approximately half of the average fleet accident rate. In 2011, Wired magazine reported that the safety record had excluded ground incidents; the USMC responded that MV-22 reporting used the same standards as other Navy aircraft.

By 2012, the USMC reported fleetwide readiness rate had risen to 68%; however, the DOD's Inspector General later found 167 of 200 reports had "improperly recorded" information. Captain Richard Ulsh blamed errors on incompetence, saying that they were "not malicious" or deliberate. The required mission capable rate was 82%, but the average was 53% from June 2007 to May 2010. In 2010, Naval Air Systems Command aimed for an 85% reliability rate by 2018. From 2009 to 2014, readiness rates rose 25% to the "high 80s", while cost per flight hour had dropped 20% to $9,520 through a rigorous maintenance improvement program that focused on diagnosing problems before failures occur. As of 2015, although the V-22 requires more maintenance and has lower availability (62%) than traditional helicopters, it also has a lower mishap rate. The average cost per flight hour is US$9,156, whereas the Sikorsky CH-53E Super Stallion cost about $20,000 (~$29,874 in 2025) per flight hour in 2007. V-22 ownership cost was $83,000 per hour in 2013. In 2022, the Pentagon evaluated its cost per flight hour at $23,941.

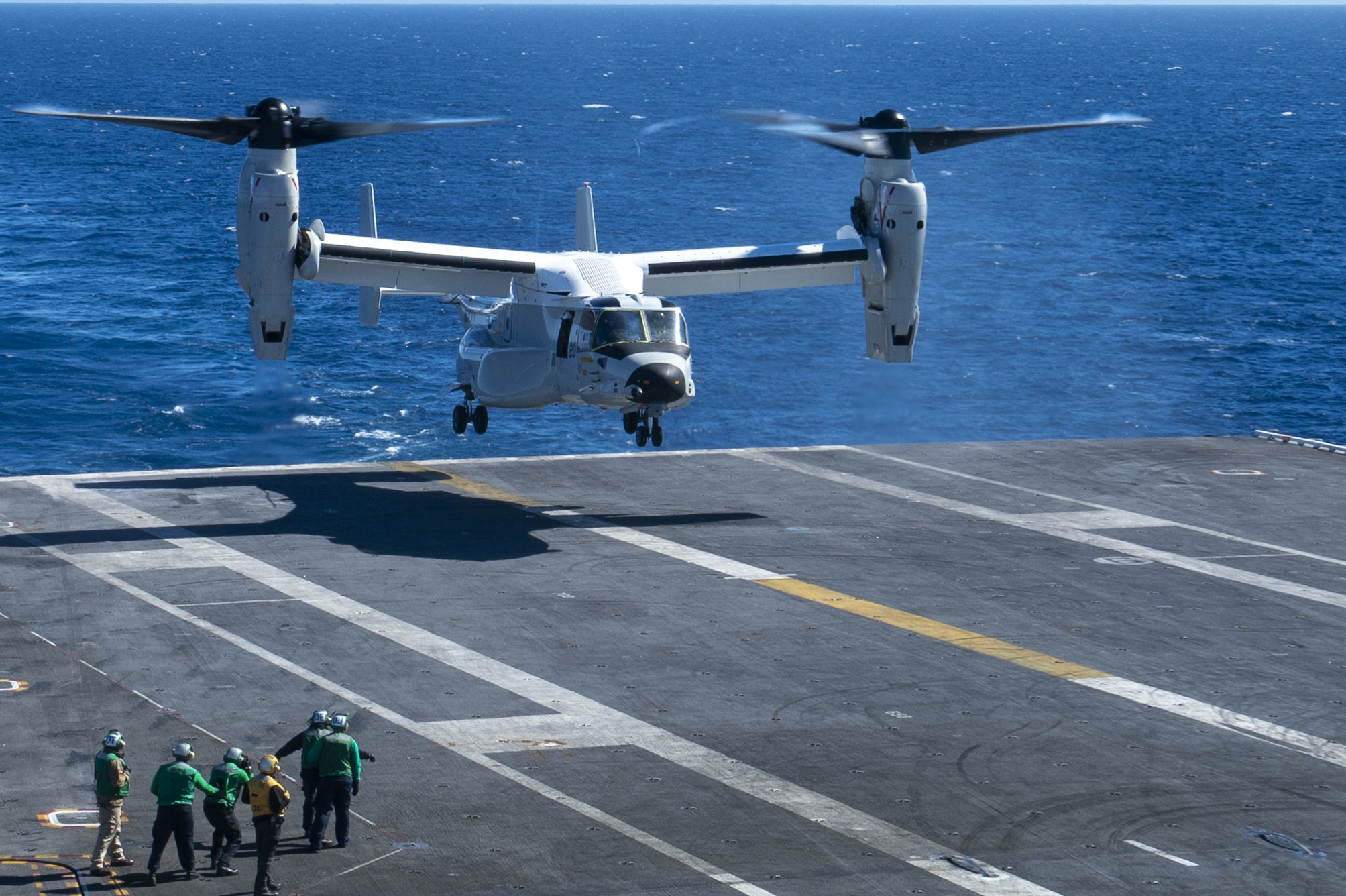
A CMV-22B lands on USS Nimitz in March 2022.

While technically capable of autorotation if both engines fail in helicopter mode, a safe landing is difficult. In 2005, a director of the Pentagon's testing office stated that in a loss of power while hovering below 1,600 feet (490 m), emergency landings "are not likely to be survivable." V-22 pilot Captain Justin "Moon" McKinney stated that: "We can turn it into a plane and glide it down, just like a C-130." A complete loss of power requires both engines to fail, as one engine can power both proprotors via interconnected drive shafts. Though vortex ring state (VRS) contributed to a deadly V-22 accident, flight testing found it to be less susceptible to VRS than conventional helicopters. A GAO report stated that the V-22 is "less forgiving than conventional helicopters" during VRS. Several test flights to explore VRS characteristics were canceled. The USMC trains pilots in the recognition of and recovery from VRS, and has instituted operational envelope limits and instrumentation to help avoid VRS conditions.

=== Production ===
On 28 September 2005, the Pentagon formally approved full-rate production, increasing from 11 V-22s per year to between 24 and 48 per year by 2012. Of the 458 total planned, 360 are for the USMC, 50 for the USAF, and 48 for the Navy at an average cost of $110 million per aircraft, including development costs. The V-22 had an incremental flyaway cost of $67 million per aircraft in 2008, The Navy had hoped to shave about $10 million off that cost via a five-year production contract in 2013. Each CV-22 cost $73 million (~$97.7 million in 2025) in the FY 2014 budget.

On 15 April 2010, the Naval Air Systems Command awarded Bell Boeing a $42.1 million (~$60.6 million in 2025) contract to design an integrated processor in response to avionics obsolescence and add new network capabilities. By 2014, Raytheon began providing an avionics upgrade that includes situational awareness and blue force tracking. In 2009, a contract for Block C upgrades was awarded to Bell Boeing. In February 2012, the USMC received the first V-22C, featuring a new radar, additional mission management and electronic warfare equipment. In 2015, options for upgrading all aircraft to the V-22C standard were examined.

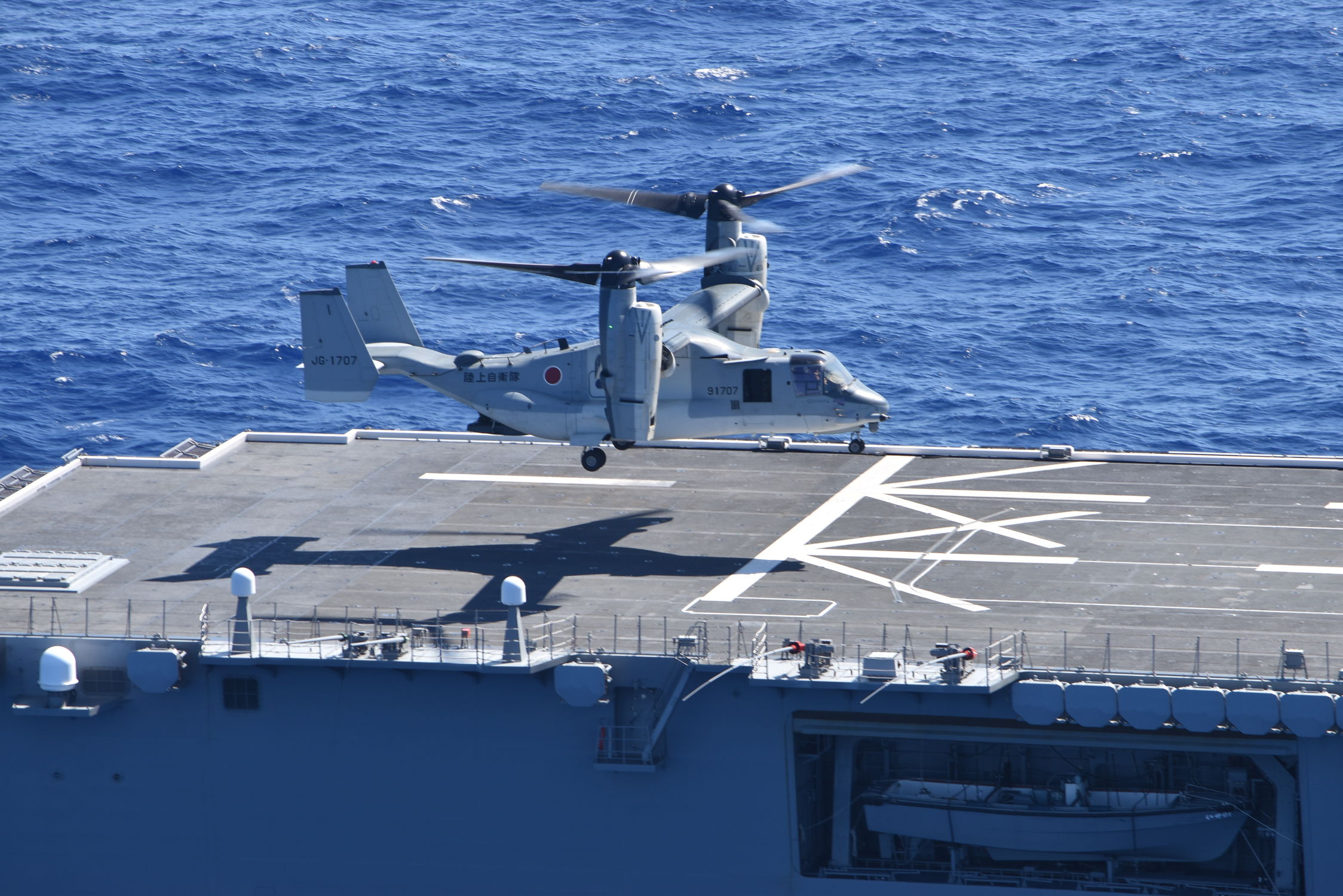
A Japanese V-22 lands on JS Ise

On 12 June 2013, the U.S. DoD awarded a $4.9 billion contract for 99 V-22s in production Lots 17 and 18, including 92 MV-22s for the USMC, for completion in September 2019. A provision gives NAVAIR the option to order 23 more Ospreys. As of June 2013, the combined value of all contracts placed totaled $6.5 billion. In 2013, Bell laid off production staff following the US's order being cut to about half of the planned number. Production rate went from 40 in 2012 to 22 planned for 2015. Manufacturing robots have replaced older automated machines for increased accuracy and efficiency; large parts are held in place by suction cups and measured electronically.

In March 2014, Air Force Special Operations Command issued a Combat Mission Need Statement for armor to protect V-22 passengers. NAVAIR worked with a Florida-based composite armor company and the Army Aviation Development Directorate to develop and deliver the advanced ballistic stopping system (ABSS) by October 2014. Costing $270,000, the ABSS consists of 66 plates fitting along interior bulkheads and deck, adding 800 lb (360 kg) to the aircraft's weight, affecting payload and range. The ABSS can be installed or removed when needed in hours and partially assembled in pieces for partial protection of specific areas. As of May 2015, 16 kits had been delivered to the USAF.

In 2015, Bell Boeing set up the V-22 Readiness Operations Center at Ridley Park, Pennsylvania, to gather information from each aircraft to improve fleet performance in a similar manner as the F-35's Autonomic Logistics Information System.

Two programs, the V-22 Cockpit Technology Replacement (VeCToR) and Renewed V-22 Aircraft Modernization Program (ReVAMP), are being studied to upgrade the aircraft and extend its life. VeCToR would upgrade the cockpit with more modern electronics in the 2030s and 40s, and ReVAMP would be a fuselage life extension program to extend the V-22's service beyond the 2060s.

== Design ==
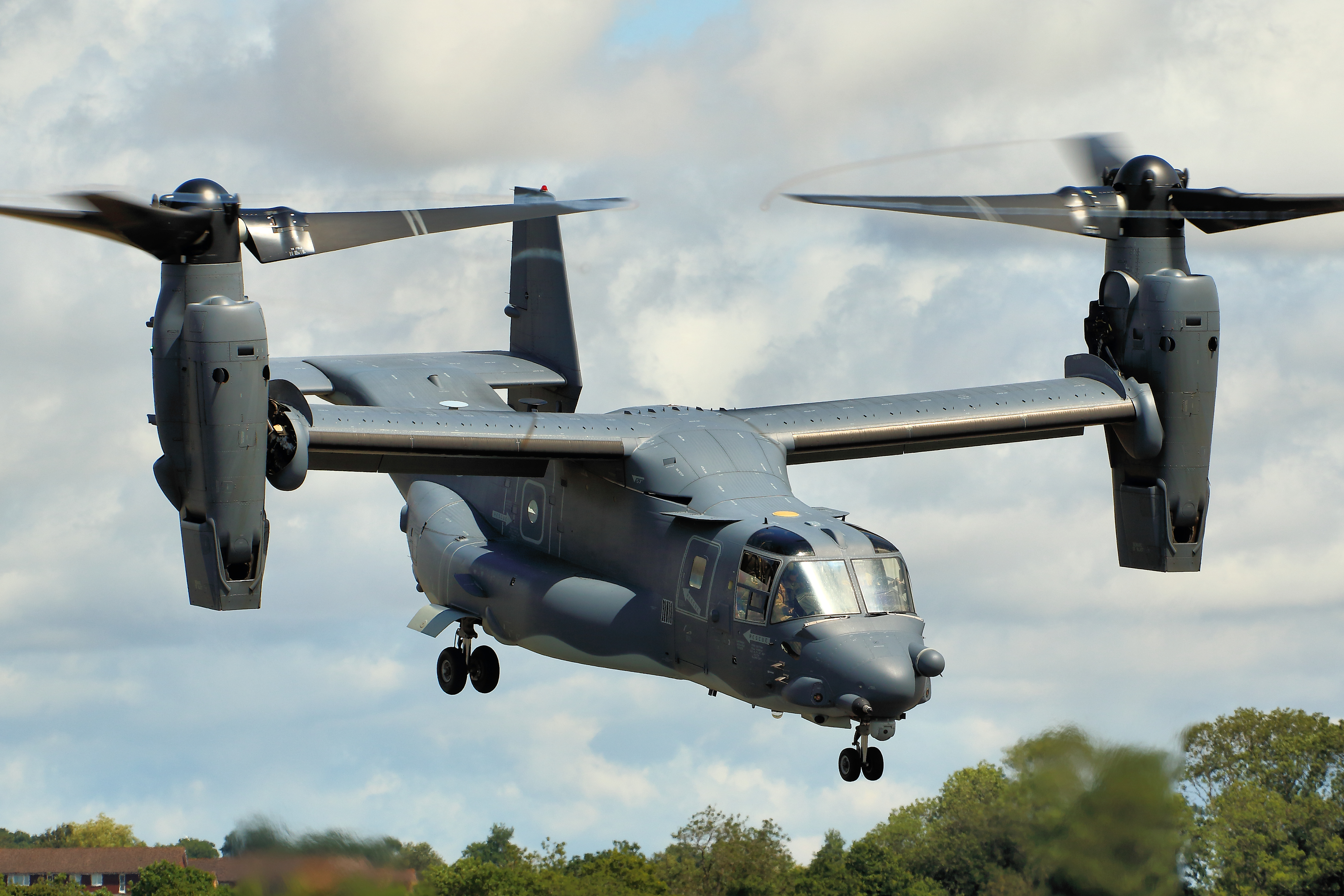
CV-22B Osprey

=== Overview ===
The Osprey is the world's first production tiltrotor aircraft, with one three-bladed proprotor, turboshaft engine, and transmission nacelle mounted on each wingtip. It is classified as a powered lift aircraft by the Federal Aviation Administration. For takeoff and landing, it typically operates as a helicopter with the nacelles vertical and rotors horizontal. Once airborne, the nacelles rotate forward 90° in as little as 12 seconds for horizontal flight, converting the V-22 to a more fuel-efficient, higher-speed aircraft, like a turboprop aircraft. STOL rolling-takeoff and landing capability is achieved by having the nacelles tilted forward up to 45°. Other orientations are possible. Pilots describe the V-22 in airplane mode as comparable to the C-130 in feel and speed. It has a ferry range of over 2,100 nmi. Its operational range is 1,100 nmi.

Composite materials make up 43% of the airframe, and the proprotor blades also use composites. For storage, the V-22's rotors fold in 90 seconds and its wing rotates to align, front-to-back, with the fuselage. Because of the requirement for folding rotors, their 38-foot (12 m) diameter is 5 feet (1.5 m) less than would be optimal for an aircraft of this size to conduct vertical takeoff, resulting in high disk loading. Most missions use fixed wing flight 75% or more of the time, reducing wear and tear and operational costs. This fixed wing flight is higher than typical helicopter missions allowing longer range line-of-sight communications for improved command and control.

Exhaust heat from the V-22's engines can potentially damage ships' flight decks and coatings. NAVAIR devised a temporary fix of portable heat shields placed under the engines and determined that a long-term solution would require redesigning decks with heat resistant coating, passive thermal barriers, and ship structure changes. Similar changes are required for F-35B operations. In 2009, DARPA requested solutions for installing robust flight deck cooling. A heat-resistant anti-skid metal spray named Thermion has been tested on USS Wasp.

=== Propulsion ===
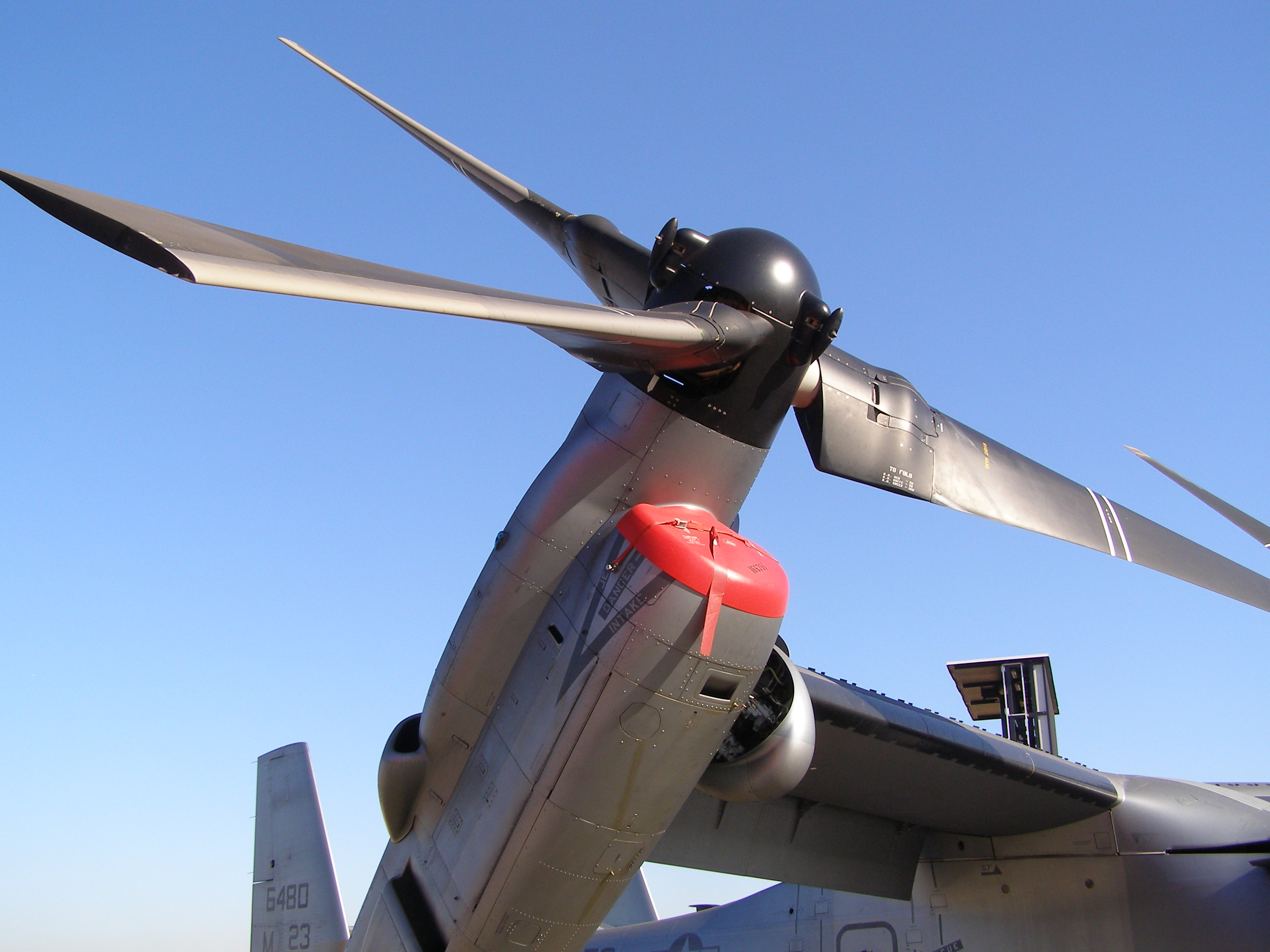
Closeup of rotor and engine of a MV-22B

The V-22's two Rolls-Royce AE 1107C engines are connected by drive shafts to a common central gearbox so that one engine can power both proprotors if an engine failure occurs. Either engine can power both proprotors through the wing driveshaft. However, the V-22 is generally not capable of hovering on one engine. If a proprotor gearbox fails, that proprotor cannot be feathered, and both engines must be stopped before an emergency landing. The autorotation characteristics are poor because of the rotors' low inertia. The AE 1107C engine has a two-shaft axial design with a 14-stage compressor, an effusion-cooled annular combustor, a two-stage gas generator turbine, and two-stage power turbine.

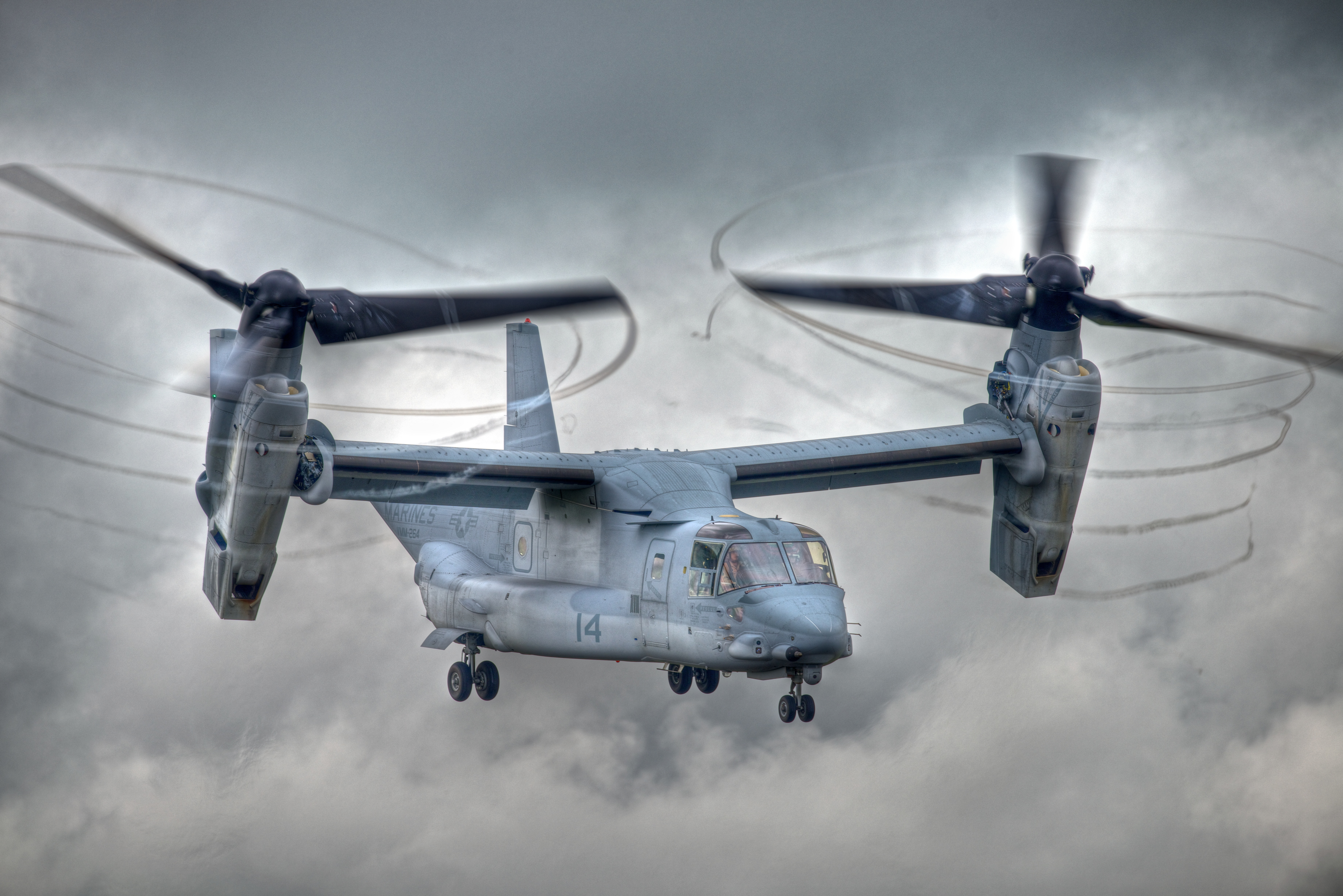
V-22 with rotors tilted, condensation trailing from propeller tips

In September 2013, Rolls-Royce announced that it had increased the AE-1107C engine's power by 17% via the adoption of a new Block 3 turbine, increased fuel valve flow capacity, and software updates; it should also improve reliability in high-altitude, high-heat conditions and boost maximum payload limitations from 6,000 to 8,000 ft (1,800 to 2,400 m). A Block 4 upgrade is reportedly being examined, which may increase power by up to 26%, producing close to 10,000 shp (7,500 kW), and improve fuel consumption.

In August 2014, the U.S. military issued a request for information for a potential drop-in replacement for the AE-1107C engines. Submissions must have a power rating of no less than 6,100 shp (4,500 kW) at 15,000 rpm, operate at up to 25,000 ft (7,600 m) at up to 130 degrees Fahrenheit (54 degrees Celsius), and fit into the existing wing nacelles with minimal structural or external modifications. In September 2014, the U.S. Navy, who already purchase engines separately to airframes, was reportedly considering an alternative engine supplier to reduce costs. The General Electric GE38 is one option, giving commonality with the Sikorsky CH-53K King Stallion.

The V-22 has a maximum rotor downwash speed of over 80 knots (92 mph; 150 km/h), more than the 64-knot (74 mph; 119 km/h) lower limit of a hurricane. The rotorwash usually prevents the starboard door's usage in hover; the rear ramp is used for rappelling and hoisting instead. The V-22 loses 10% of its vertical lift over a tiltwing design when operating in helicopter mode because of the wings' airflow resistance, while the tiltrotor design has better short takeoff and landing performance. V-22s must keep at least 25 ft (7.6 m) of vertical separation between each other to avoid each other's rotor wake, which causes turbulence and potentially control loss. The extreme rotor downwash of the V-22 has caused incidents when rappelling or fast roping from the aircraft, including a soldier being blown 3 meters away from his intended dismount point by the force of the downwash. The downwash is strong enough to destroy unstrengthened helipads and can create flying debris in the landing zone that can injure bystanders or potentially damage the aircraft; an incident involving a Marine Corps Osprey in 2010 resulted in 10 bystanders suffering downwash-related injuries.

=== Avionics ===
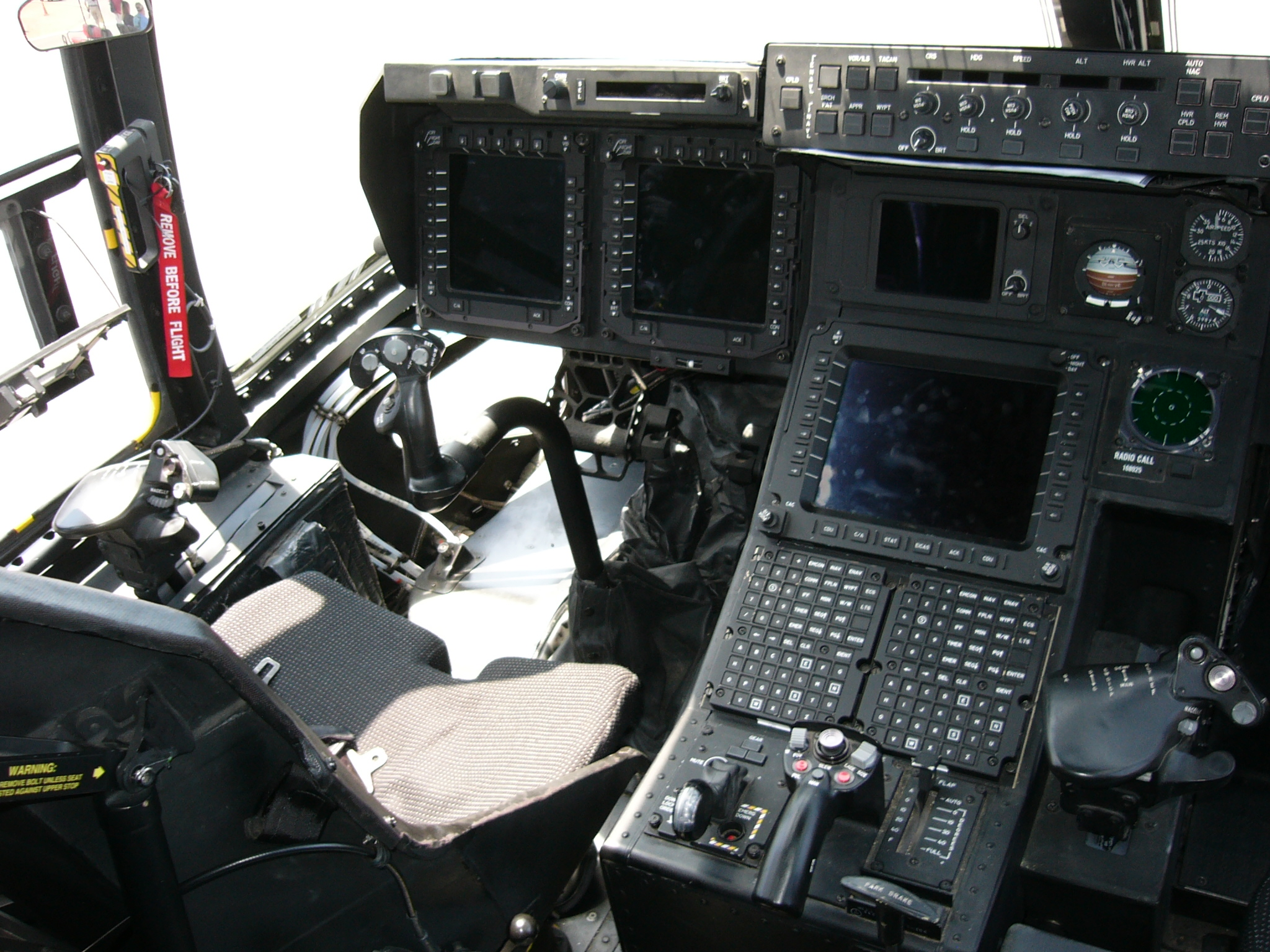
An MV-22 cockpit on display at 2012 Wings over Gillespie

The V-22 is equipped with a glass cockpit, which incorporates four multi-function displays (MFDs, compatible with night-vision goggles) and one shared central display unit, to display various images including: digimaps, imagery from the Turreted forward-looking infrared system primary flight instruments, navigation (TACAN, VOR, ILS, GPS, INS), and system status. The flight director panel of the cockpit management system allows for fully coupled (autopilot) functions that take the aircraft from forward flight into a 50 ft (15 m) hover with no pilot interaction other than programming the system. The fuselage is not pressurized, and personnel must wear on-board oxygen masks above 10,000 feet.

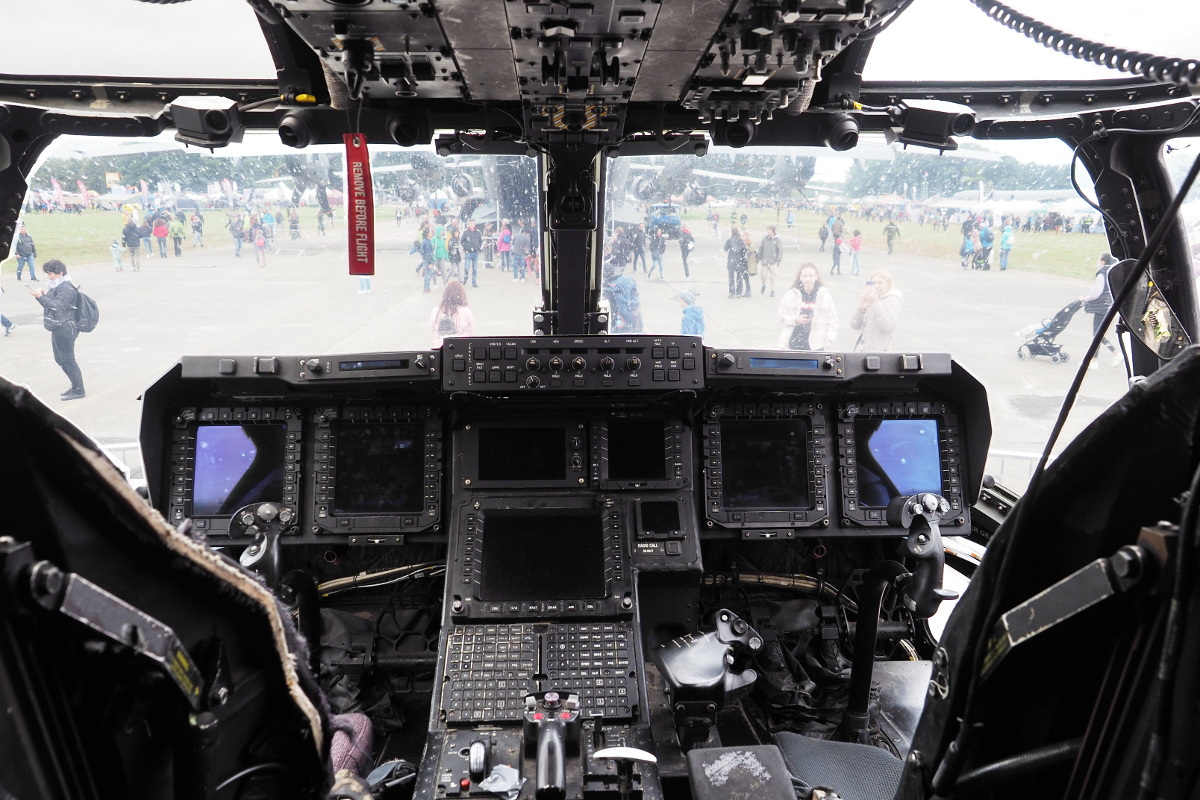
V-22 cockpit, 2021

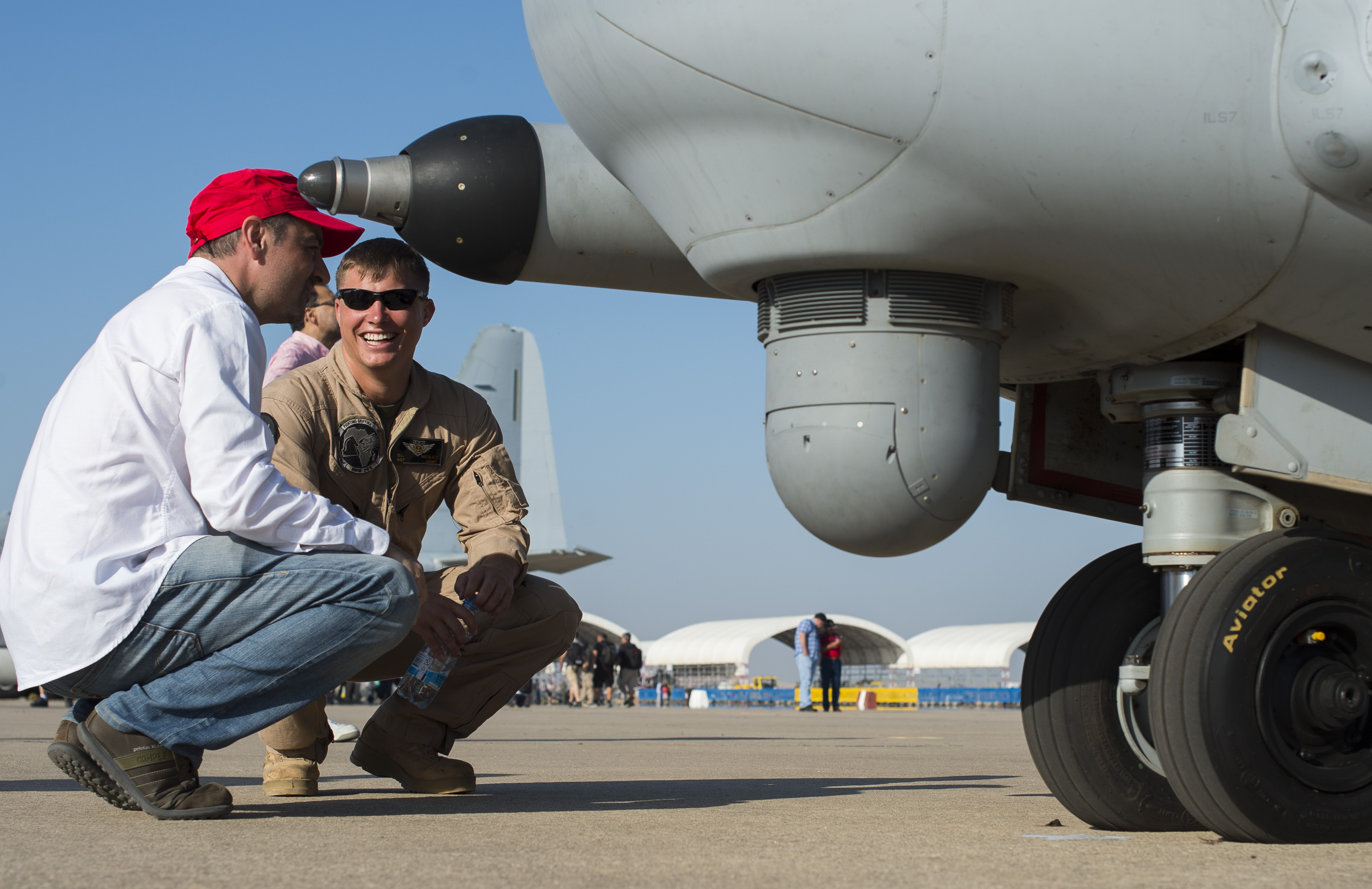
Camera under cockpit

The V-22 has triple-redundant fly-by-wire flight control systems; these have computerized damage control to automatically isolate damaged areas. With the nacelles pointing straight up in conversion mode at 90° the flight computers command it to fly like a helicopter, cyclic forces being applied to a conventional swashplate at the rotor hub. With the nacelles in airplane mode (0°) the flaperons, rudder, and elevator fly similar to an airplane. This is a gradual transition, occurring over the nacelles' rotation range; the lower the nacelles, the greater effect of the airplane-mode control surfaces. The nacelles can rotate past vertical to 97.5° for rearward flight. The V-22 can use the "80 Jump" orientation with the nacelles at 80° for takeoff to quickly achieve high altitude and speed. The controls automate to the extent that it can hover in low wind without hands on the controls.

New USMC V-22 pilots learn to fly helicopter and multiengine fixed-wing aircraft before the tiltrotor. Some V-22 pilots believe that former fixed-wing pilots may be preferable over helicopter users, as they are not trained to constantly adjust the controls in hover. Others say that experience with helicopters' hovering and precision is most important. As of April 2021 the US military does not track whether fixed-wing or helicopter pilots transition more easily to the V-22, according to USMC Colonel Matthew Kelly, V-22 project manager. He said that fixed-wing pilots are more experienced at instrument flying, while helicopter pilots are more experienced at scanning outside when the aircraft is moving slowly.

=== Armament ===
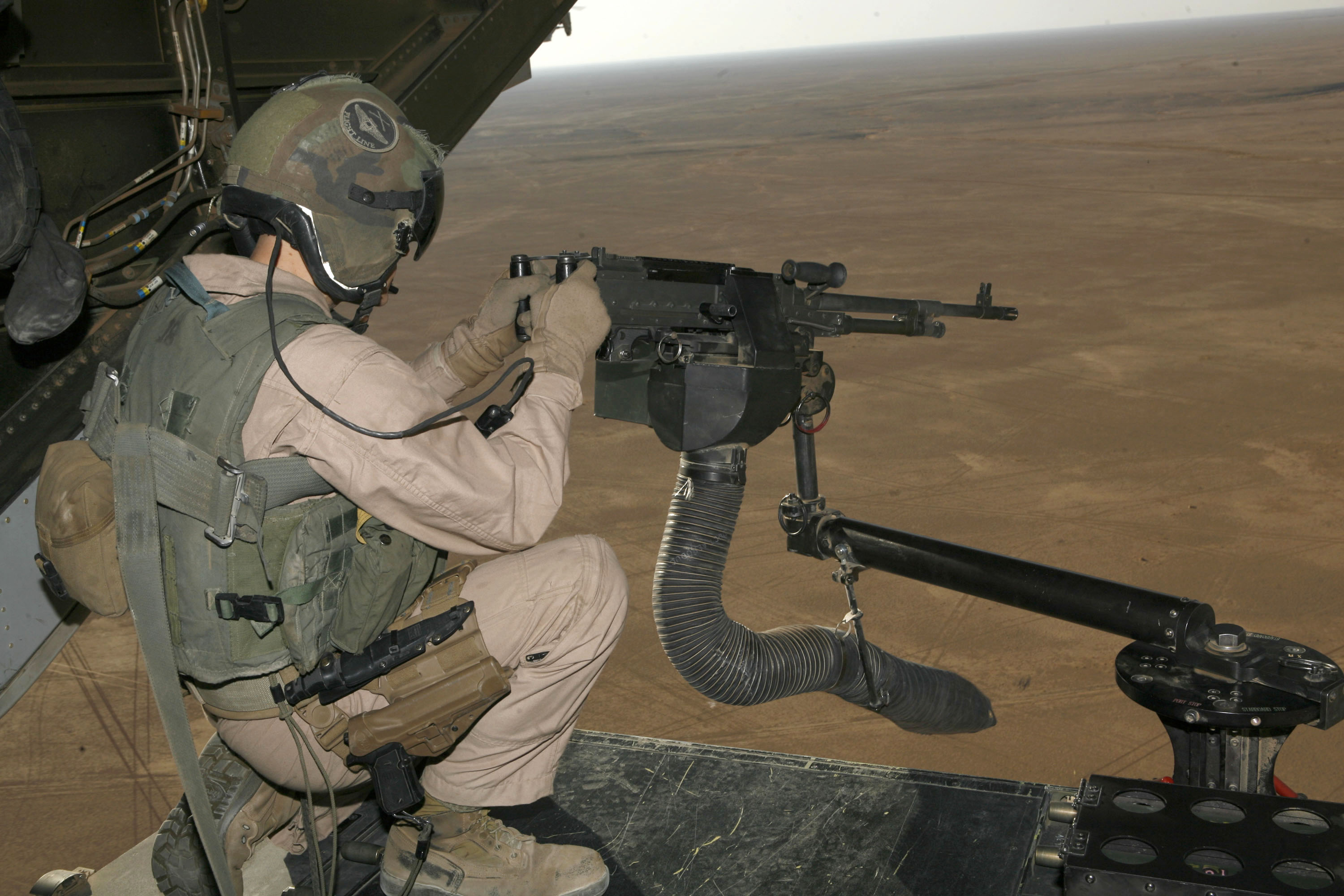
M240 machine gun mounted on V-22 loading ramp in Iraq, 2007

Belly-mounted GAU-17 firing from an MV-22 Osprey

The V-22 can be armed with one 7.62×51mm NATO (.308 in caliber) M240 machine gun or .50 in caliber (12.7 mm) M2 machine gun on the rear loading ramp. A 12.7 mm (.50 in) GAU-19 three-barrel Gatling gun mounted below the nose was studied. BAE Systems developed a belly-mounted, remotely operated gun turret system, the Interim Defense Weapon System (IDWS); it is remotely operated by a gunner, targets are acquired via a separate pod using color television and forward looking infrared imagery. The IDWS was installed on half of the V-22s deployed to Afghanistan in 2009; it found limited use because of its 800 lb (360 kg) weight and restrictive rules of engagement.

There were 32 IDWSs available to the USMC in June 2012; V-22s often flew without it as the added weight reduced cargo capacity. The V-22's speed allows it to outrun conventional support helicopters, thus a self-defense capability was required on long-range independent operations. The infrared gun camera proved useful for reconnaissance and surveillance. Other weapons were studied to provide all-quadrant fire, including nose guns, door guns, and non-lethal countermeasures to work with the current ramp-mounted machine gun and the IDWS.

In 2014, the USMC studied new weapons with "all-axis, stand-off, and precision capabilities", akin to the AGM-114 Hellfire, AGM-176 Griffin, Joint Air-to-Ground Missile, and GBU-53/B SDB II. In November 2014, Bell Boeing conducted self-funded weapons tests, equipping a V-22 with a pylon on the front fuselage and replacing the AN/AAQ-27A EO camera with an L-3 Wescam MX-15 sensor/laser designator. 26 unguided Hydra 70 rockets, two guided APKWS rockets, and two Griffin B missiles were fired over five flights. The USMC and USAF sought a traversable nose-mounted weapon connected to a helmet-mounted sight; recoil complicated integrating a forward-facing gun. A pylon could carry 300 lb (140 kg) of munitions. However, by 2019, the USMC opted for IDWS upgrades over adopting new weapons.

=== Refueling capability ===
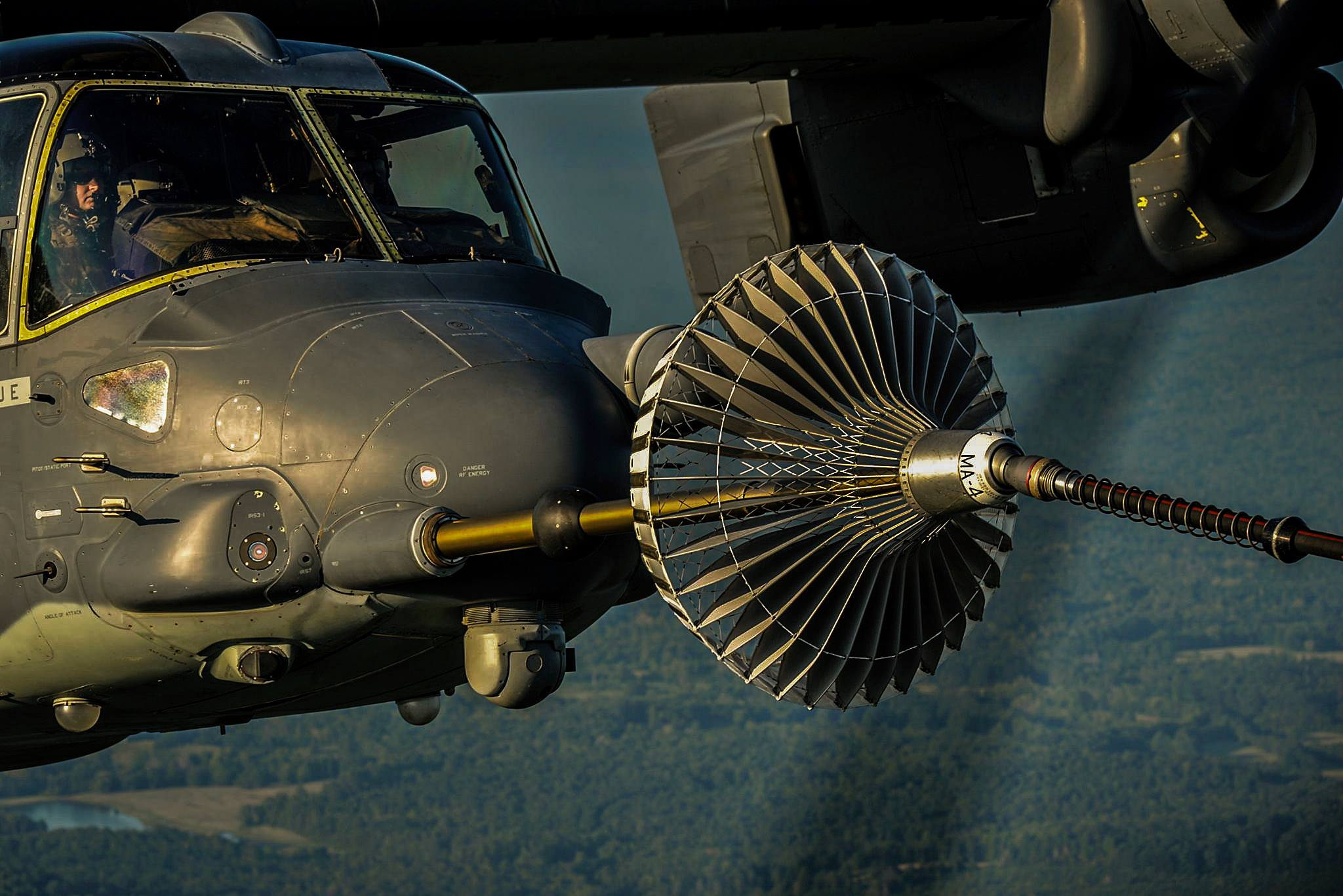
CV-22 Osprey connects to a refueling probe

Boeing is developing a roll-on/roll-off aerial refueling kit, which would give the V-22 the ability to refuel other aircraft. Having an aerial refueling capability that can be based on Wasp-class amphibious assault ships would increase the F-35B's strike power, removing reliance on refueling assets solely based on large Nimitz-class aircraft carriers or land bases. The roll-on/roll-off kit can also be applicable to intelligence, surveillance and reconnaissance (ISR) functions. Boeing funded a non-functional demonstration on a VMX-22 aircraft; a prototype kit was successfully tested with an F/A-18 on 5 September 2013.

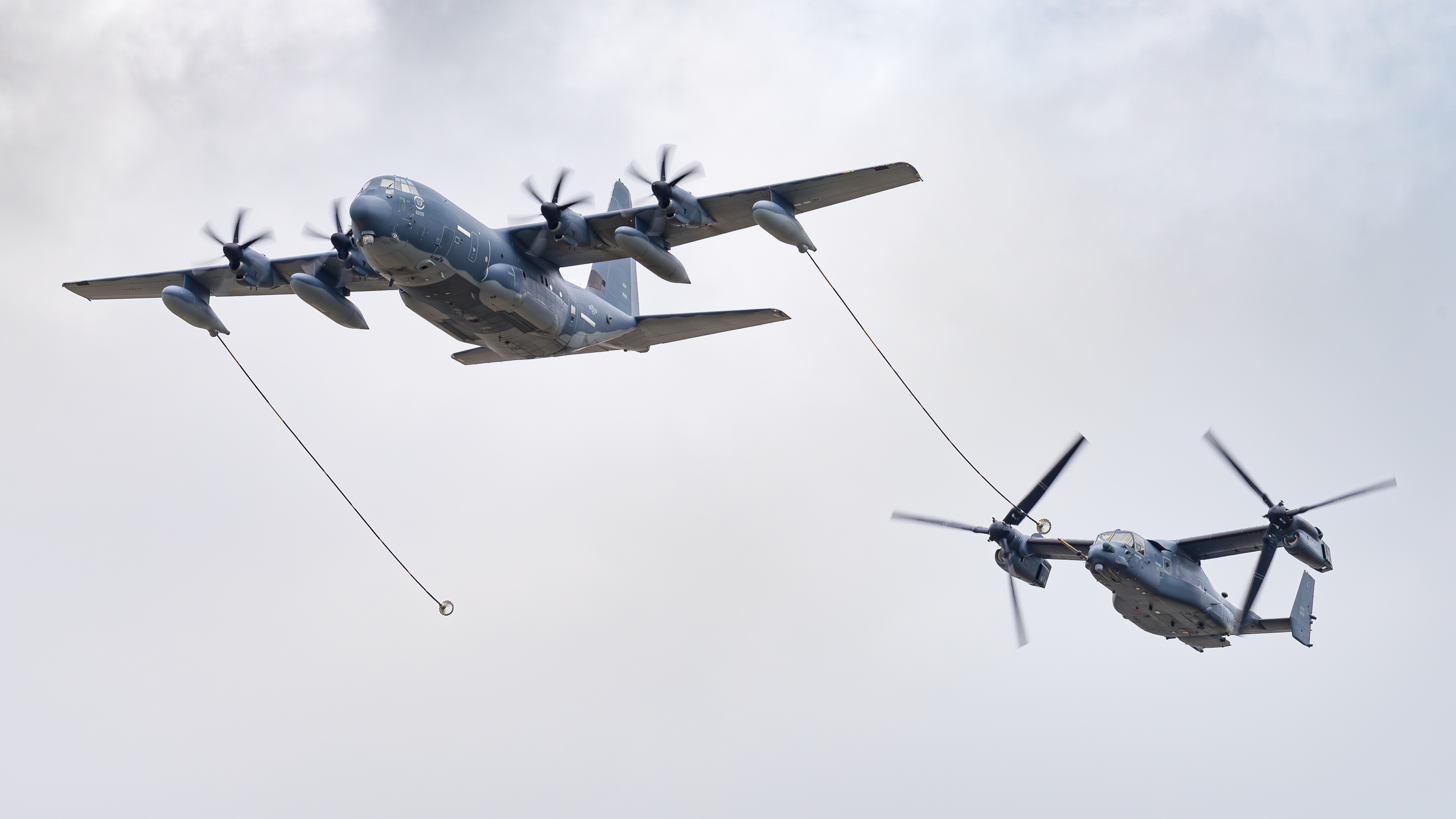
V-22 in refueling operations with a MC-130J Hercules, 2023

The high-speed version of the hose/drogue refueling system can be deployed at 185 knots (213 mph; 343 km/h) and function at up to 250 knots (290 mph; 460 km/h). A mix of tanks and a roll-on/roll-off bladder house up to 12,000 lb (5,400 kg) of fuel. The ramp must open to extend the hose, then raised once extended. It can refuel rotorcraft, needing a separate drogue used specifically by helicopters and a converted nacelle. Many USMC ground vehicles can run on aviation fuel; a refueling V-22 could service these. In late 2014, it was stated that V-22 tankers could be in use by 2017, but contract delays pushed IOC to late 2019. As part of a 26 May 2016 contract award to Boeing, Cobham was contracted to adapt their FR-300 hose drum unit as used by the KC-130 in October 2016. In May 2025, the Navy confirmed that V-22s were not training for aerial refueling missions, and that neither NAVAIR nor the V-22 program office intends to pursue such a capability as there was no interest from the fleet.

== Operational history ==
In October 2019, the fleet of 375 V-22s operated by the U.S. Armed Forces surpassed the 500,000 flight hour mark. A fatal accident in December 2023, led the fleet being grounded until March 2024 by the US and Japan.

=== U.S. Marine Corps ===
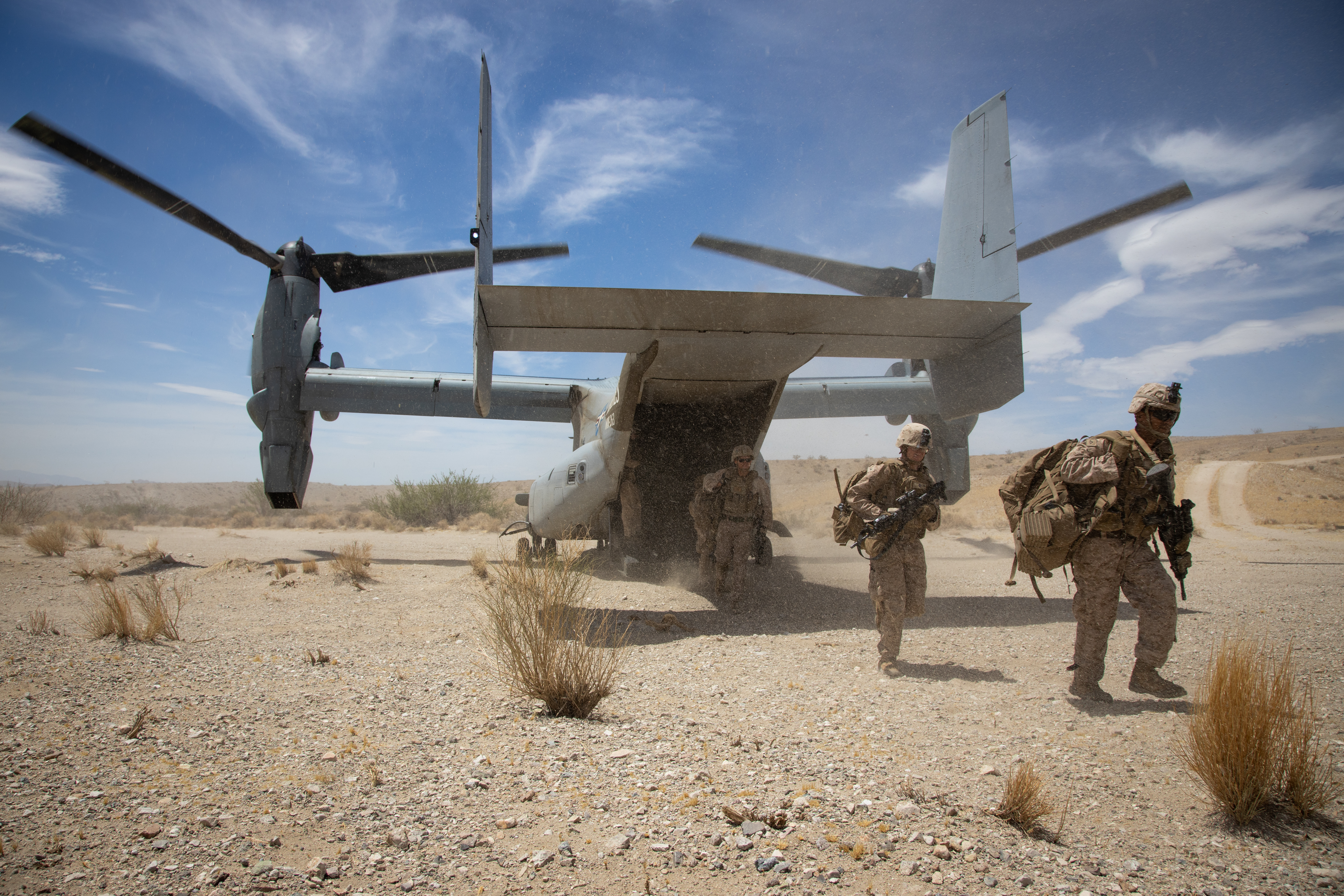
Marines disembark from an MV-22 near Marine Corps Air Ground Combat Center Twentynine Palms, California, 2019.

Since March 2000, VMMT-204 has conducted training for the type. In December 2005, Lieutenant General James Amos, commander of II Marine Expeditionary Force, accepted delivery of the first batch of MV-22s. The unit reactivated in March 2006 as the first MV-22 squadron, redesignated as VMM-263. In 2007, HMM-266 became Marine Medium Tiltrotor Squadron 266 (VMM-266) and reached initial operational capability. The MV-22 started replacing the CH-46 Sea Knight in 2007; the CH-46 was retired in October 2014. On 13 April 2007, the USMC announced the first V-22 combat deployment at Al Asad Airbase, Iraq.

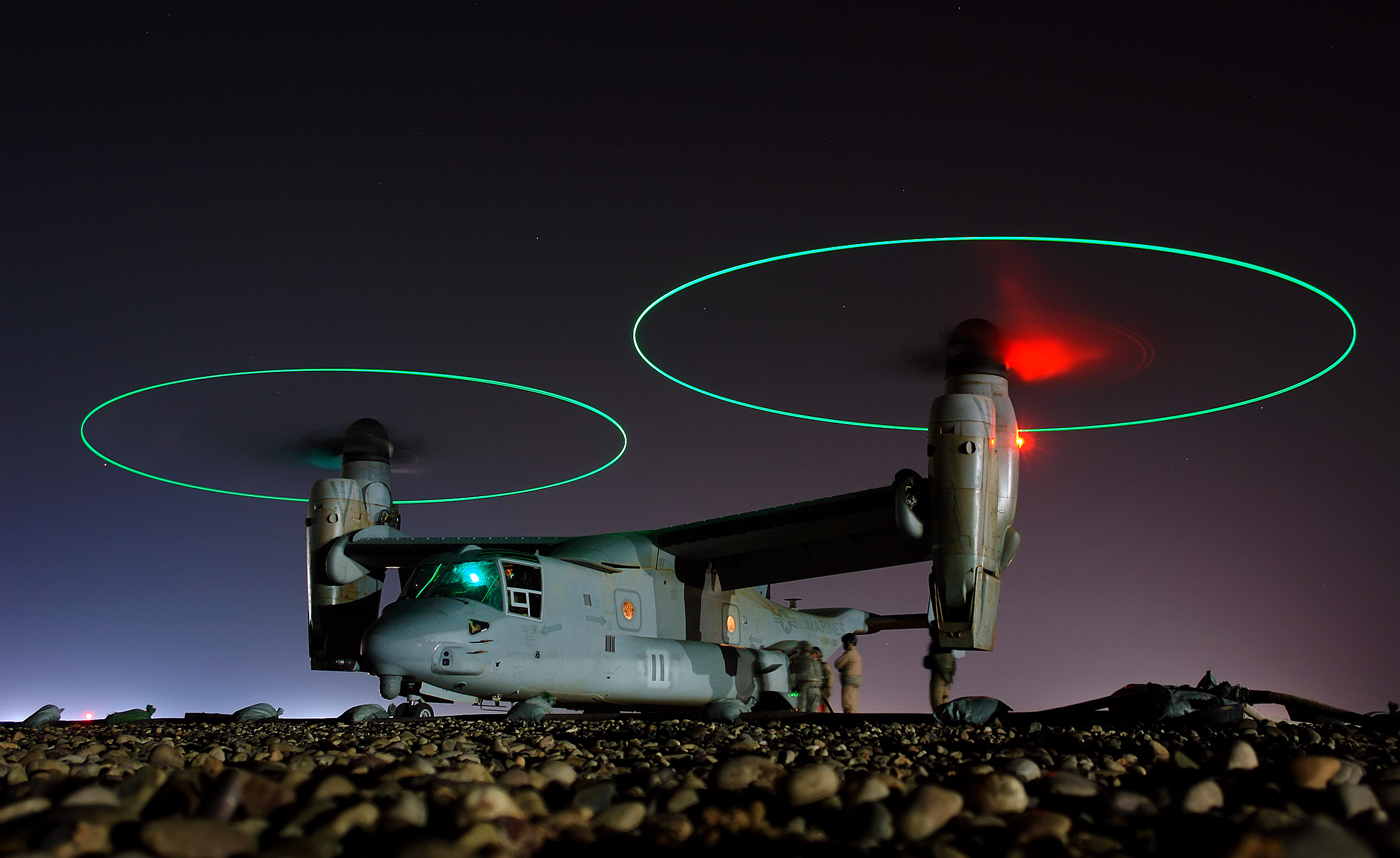
Crew refuels an MV-22 before a night mission in Iraq, 2008

V-22s in Iraq's Anbar province were used for transport and scout missions. General David Petraeus, the top U.S. military commander in Iraq, used one to visit troops on Christmas Day 2007; as did Barack Obama during his 2008 presidential campaign tour in Iraq. USMC Col. Kelly recalled how visitors were reluctant to fly on the unfamiliar aircraft, but after seeing its speed and ability to fly above ground fire, "All of a sudden, the entire flight schedule was booked. No senior officer wanted to go anywhere unless they could fly on the V-22". Obtaining spares proved problematic. By July 2008, the V-22 had flown 3,000 sorties totaling 5,200 hours in Iraq. General George J. Trautman III praised its greater speed and range over legacy helicopters, saying "it turned his battle space from the size of Texas into the size of Rhode Island." Despite attacks by man-portable air-defense systems and small arms, none were lost to enemy fire by late 2009.

A Government Accountability Office study stated that by January 2009, the 12 MV-22s in Iraq had completed all assigned missions; mission capable rates averaged 57% to 68%, and an overall full mission capable rate of 6%. It also noted weaknesses in situational awareness, maintenance, shipboard operations and transport capability. The report concluded: "deployments confirmed that the V-22's enhanced speed and range enable personnel and internal cargo to be transported faster and farther than is possible with the legacy helicopters".

MV-22s deployed to Afghanistan in November 2009 with VMM-261; it saw its first offensive combat mission, Operation Cobra's Anger, on 4 December 2009. V-22s assisted in inserting 1,000 USMC and 150 Afghan troops into the Now Zad Valley of Helmand Province in southern Afghanistan to disrupt Taliban operations. General James Amos stated that Afghanistan's MV-22s had surpassed 100,000 flight hours, calling it "the safest airplane, or close to the safest airplane" in the USMC inventory. The V-22's Afghan deployment was set to end in late 2013 with the drawdown of combat operations; however, VMM-261 was directed to extend operations for casualty evacuation, being quicker than helicopters enabled more casualties to reach a hospital within the 'golden hour'; they were fitted with medical equipment such as heart monitors and triage supplies.

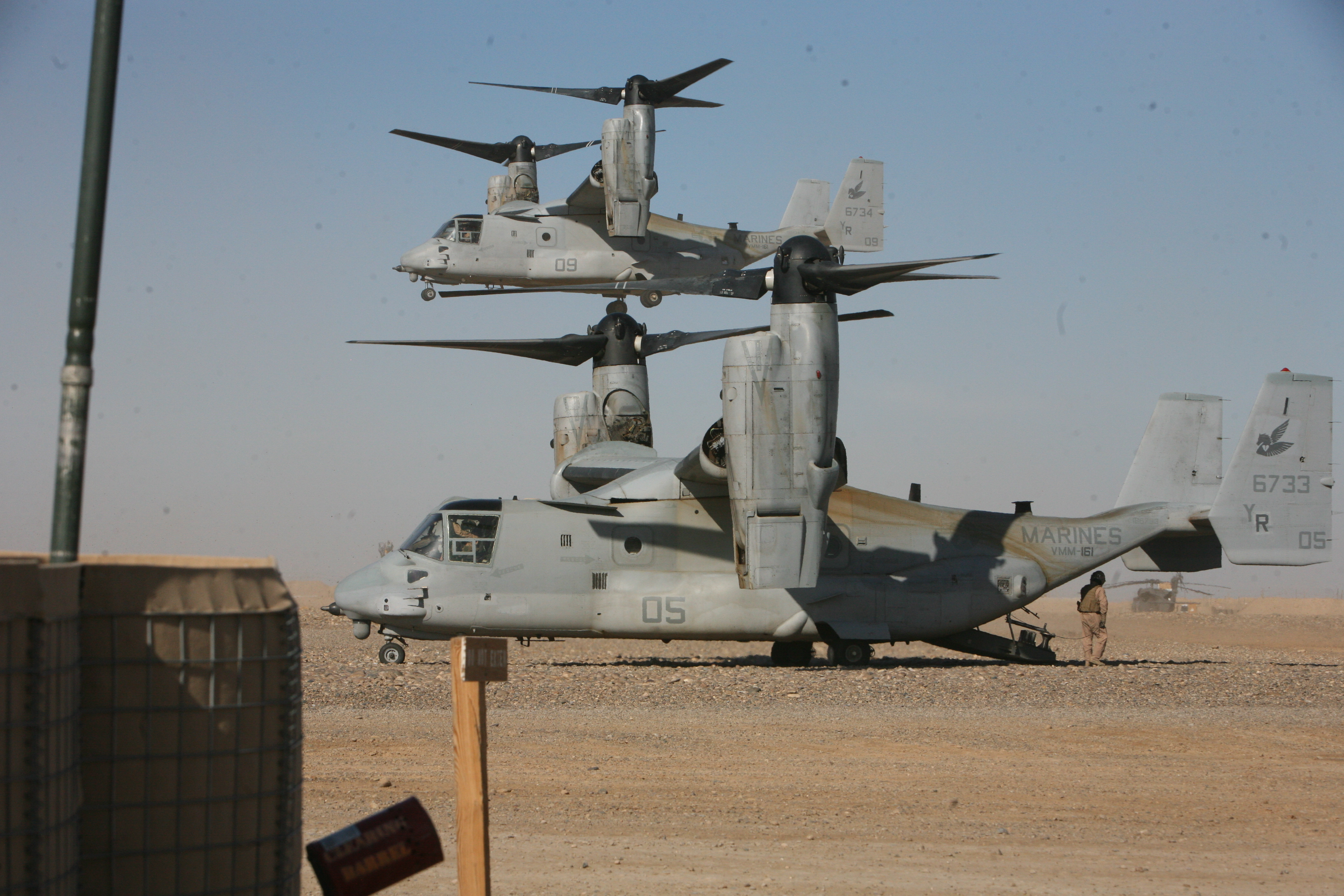
Two U.S. Marine Corps MV-22s of VMM-161 land at a forward operating base in Afghanistan, 2012

In January 2010, the MV-22 was sent to Haiti as part of Operation Unified Response relief efforts after an earthquake, the type's first humanitarian mission. In March 2011, two MV-22s from Kearsarge helped rescue a downed USAF F-15E crew member during Operation Odyssey Dawn. On 2 May 2011, following Operation Neptune's Spear, the body of Osama bin Laden, founder of the al-Qaeda terrorist group, was flown by an MV-22 to the aircraft carrier Carl Vinson in the Arabian Sea, prior to his burial at sea.

In 2013, several MV-22s received communications and seating modifications to support the Marine One presidential transport squadron because of the urgent need for CH-53Es in Afghanistan. In May 2010, Boeing announced plans to submit the V-22 for the VXX presidential transport replacement.

From 2 to 5 August 2013, two MV-22s completed the longest distance Osprey tanking mission to date. Flying from Marine Corps Air Station Futenma in Okinawa alongside two KC-130J tankers, they flew to Clark Air Base in the Philippines on 2 August; then to Darwin, Australia, on 3 August; to Townsville, Australia, on 4 August; and finally rendezvoused with Bonhomme Richard on 5 August.

In 2013, the USMC formed an intercontinental response force, the Special Purpose Marine Air-Ground Task Force – Crisis Response – Africa, using V-22s outfitted with specialized communications gear. In 2013, following Typhoon Haiyan, 12 MV-22s of the 3rd Marine Expeditionary Brigade were deployed to the Philippines for disaster relief operations; its abilities were described as "uniquely relevant", flying faster and with greater payloads while moving supplies throughout the island archipelago.

On 9 October 2014, the last operational Marine Corps CH-46 squadron, HMM-364, re-designated as VMM-364. On 1 August 2015, the Marine Corps retired its final CH-46 and completed its transition from CH-46 Sea Knight to the MV-22 Osprey.

=== U.S. Air Force ===
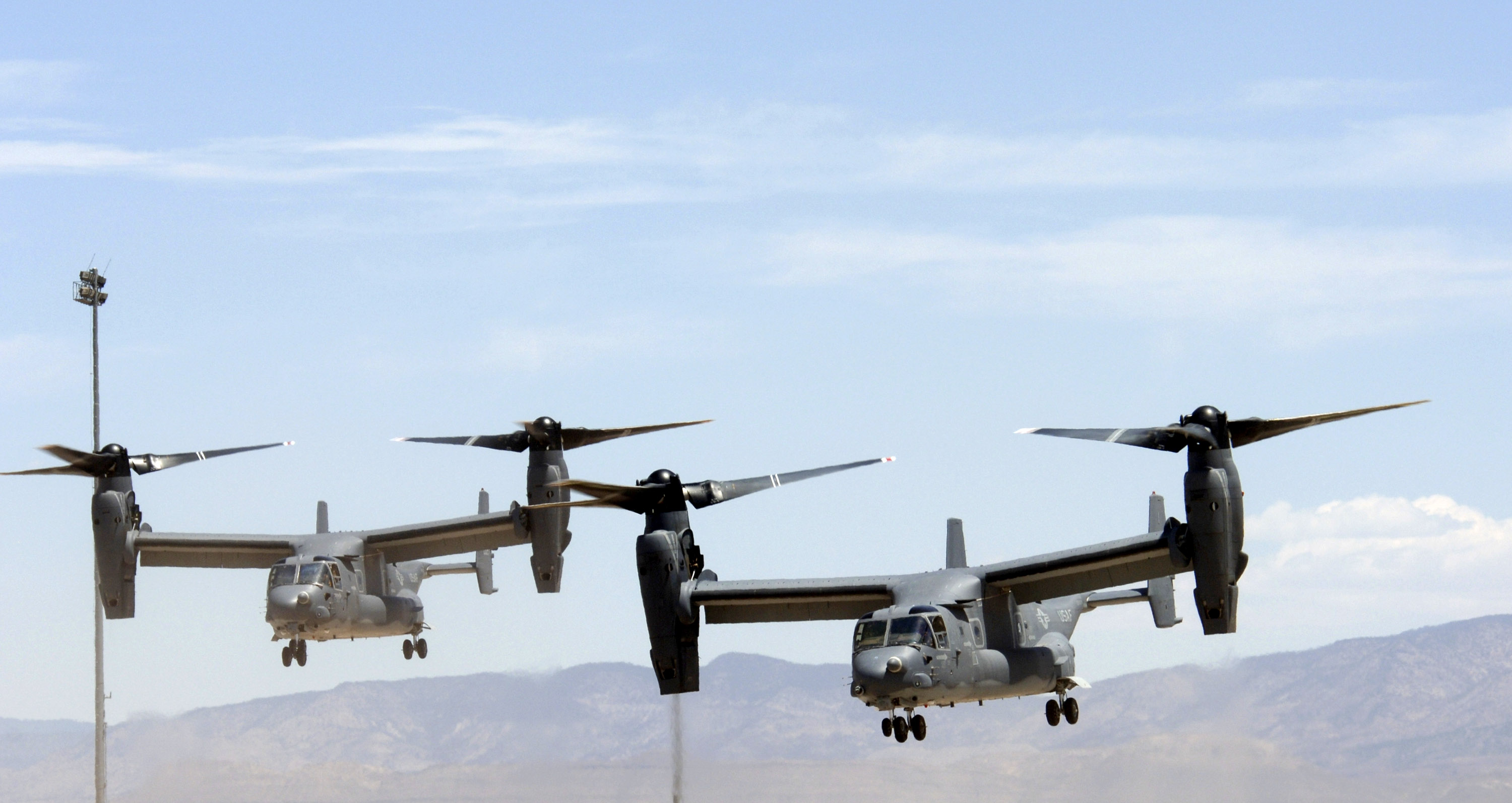
A pair of USAF CV-22s land at Holloman AFB, New Mexico, in 2006

The USAF's first operational CV-22 was delivered to the 58th Special Operations Wing (58th SOW) at Kirtland Air Force Base, New Mexico, in March 2006. Early aircraft were delivered to the 58th SOW and used for training personnel for special operations use. On 16 November 2006, the USAF officially accepted the CV-22 in a ceremony conducted at Hurlburt Field, Florida. The USAF's first operational deployment sent four CV-22s to Mali in November 2008 in support of Exercise Flintlock. The CV-22s flew nonstop from Hurlburt Field, Florida, with in-flight refueling. AFSOC declared that the 8th Special Operations Squadron reached Initial Operational Capability in March 2009, with six CV-22s in service.

V-22 Osprey USAF video

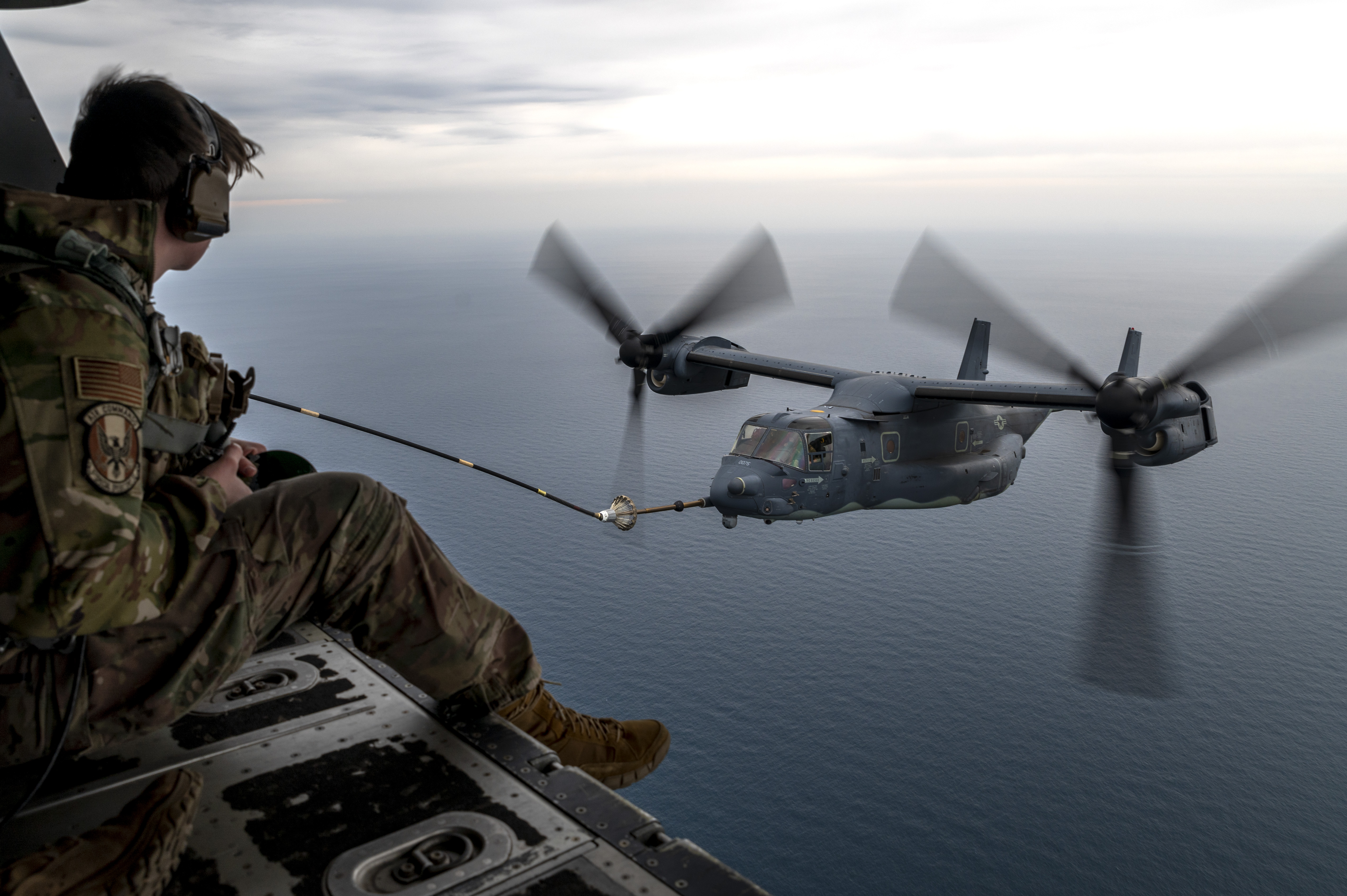
CV-22 refuels during operation Freedom Shield 23

In December 2013, three CV-22s came under small arms fire while trying to evacuate American civilians in Bor, South Sudan, during the 2013 South Sudanese political crisis; the aircraft flew 500 mi (800 km) to Entebbe, Uganda, after the mission was aborted. South Sudanese officials stated that the attackers were rebels. The CV-22s had flown to Bor over three countries across 790 nmi (910 mi; 1,460 km). The formation was hit 119 times, wounding four crew and causing flight control failures and hydraulic and fuel leaks on all three aircraft. Fuel leaks resulted in multiple air-to-air refuelings en route. After the incident, AFSOC developed optional armor floor panels.

The USAF found that "CV-22 wake modeling is inadequate for a trailing aircraft to make accurate estimations of safe separation [distance] from the preceding aircraft." In 2015, the USAF sought to configure the CV-22 to perform combat search and rescue in addition to its long-range special operations transport mission. It would complement the HH-60G Pave Hawk and planned HH-60W rescue helicopters, being employed in scenarios where high speed is better suited to search and rescue than more nimble but slower helicopters. In 2019, a plan was formulated for the USAF V-22 to use the AN/APQ-187 Silent Knight terrain avoidance radar, which was tested on the CV-22 at Eglin Air Force base by 2020. This radar is used on many Air Force aircraft, such as C-130 Hercules transport aircraft and MH-47 Chinook helicopters.

On 29 November 2023, a CV-22B assigned to the US Air Force's 353rd Special Operations Wing crashed into the East China Sea off Yakushima Island, Japan, killing all eight airmen aboard. The Osprey, based at Yokota Air Base, was flying from Marine Corps Air Station Iwakuni to Kadena Air Base on Okinawa Island in clear weather and light winds. An Air Force investigation into the cause of the crash is ongoing. A preliminary investigation has revealed a "potential materiel failure" could have caused the accident. On 6 December 2023, the U.S. Navy (NAVAIR) and the Air Force (AFSOC) grounded their V-22 fleets. Japan (Maritime Self Defense Force) also has grounded their fleet. In early March the US and Japan resumed flights of the V-22 with revised maintenance and pilot training focuses but no changes to the aircraft. The V-22 was returned to flight with no changes; the part that failed was identified and how it failed determined, although the accident was still under scrutiny. A near crash in December 2024 led to another operation pause, over concerns about metal fatigue.

In January 2026, the V-22 was used in combat during the US intervention in Venezuela.

=== U.S. Navy ===
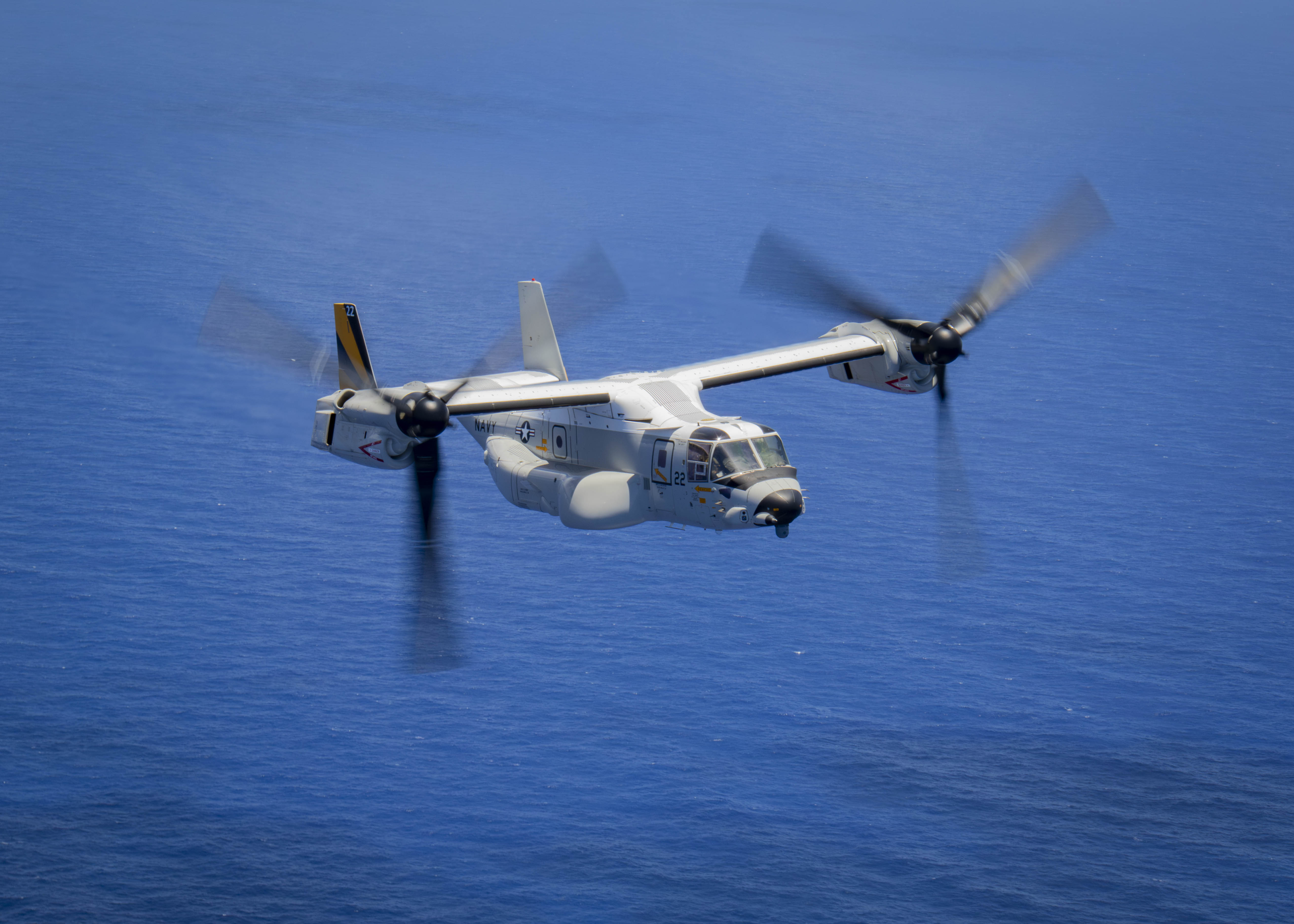
United States Navy CMV-22B

The V-22 program originally included Navy 48 HV-22s, but none were ordered. In 2009, it was proposed that it replace the C-2 Greyhound for carrier onboard delivery (COD) duties. One advantage of the V-22 is the ability to deliver supplies and people between non-carrier ships beyond helicopter range. Proponents said that it is capable of similar speed, payload capacity, and lift performance to the C-2, and can carry greater payloads over short ranges, up to 20,000 lb, including suspended external loads. The C-2 can only deliver cargo to carriers, requiring further distribution to smaller vessels via helicopters, while the V-22 is certified for operating upon amphibious ships, aircraft carriers, and logistics ships. It could also take some helicopter roles by fitting a 600 lb hoist to the ramp and a cabin configuration for 12 non-ambulatory patients and 5 seats for medical attendants. Bell and P&W designed a frame for the V-22 to transport the Pratt & Whitney F135 engine of the F-35.

On 5 January 2015, the Navy and USMC signed a memorandum of understanding to buy the V-22 for the COD mission. Initially designated HV-22, four aircraft were bought each year from 2018 to 2020. It incorporates an extended-range fuel system for an 1,150 nmi (1,320 mi; 2,130 km) unrefueled range, a high-frequency radio for over-the-horizon communications, and a public address system to communicate with passengers; the range increase comes from extra fuel bladders in larger external sponsons, the only external difference from other variants. Its primary mission is long-range logistics; other conceivable missions include personnel recovery and special warfare. In February 2016, the Navy officially designated it the CMV-22B. The Navy's Program of Record originally called for 48 aircraft, but it was later determined that only 44 were required. Production began in FY 2018, and deliveries started in 2020.

The Navy ordered the first 39 CMV-22Bs in June 2018; initial operating capability was achieved in 2021, with fielding to the fleet by the mid-2020s. The first CMV-22B made its initial flight in December 2019. The first deployment began in summer 2021 aboard USS Carl Vinson. The Navy is planning an upgraded gearbox for their CMV-22B.

=== Japan Self-Defense Forces ===
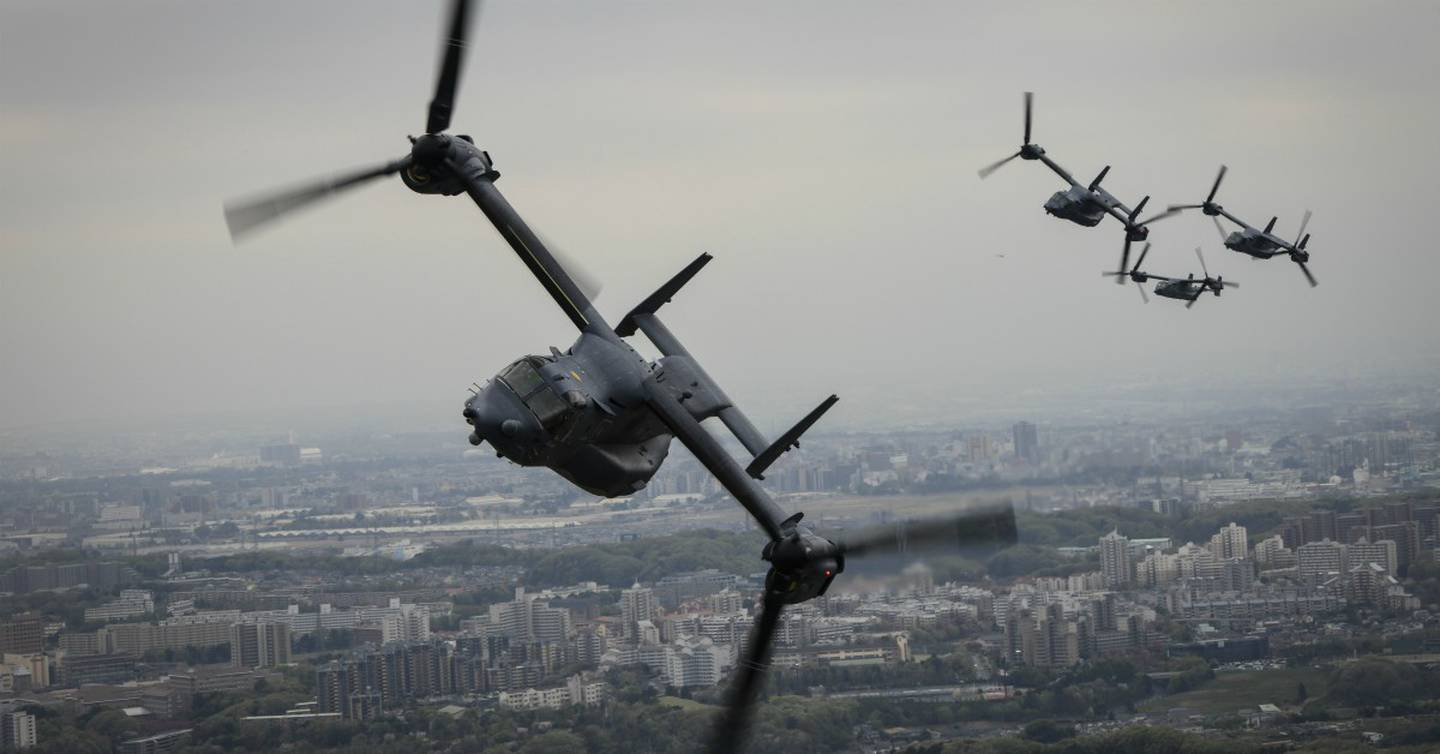
CV-22 Ospreys fly over Tokyo, Japan

Japan bought the V-22 and they entered defense service in 2020, becoming the first international customer for the tiltrotor.

In 2012, Defense Minister Satoshi Morimoto ordered an investigation of the costs of V-22 operations. The V-22's capabilities exceeded current Japan Self-Defense Forces helicopters in terms of range, speed and payload. The ministry anticipated deployments to the Nansei Islands and the Senkaku Islands, as well as in multinational cooperation with the U.S. In November 2014, the Japanese Ministry of Defense decided to procure 17 V-22s. The first V-22 for Japan undertook its first flight in August 2017 and the aircraft began delivery to the Japanese military in 2020.

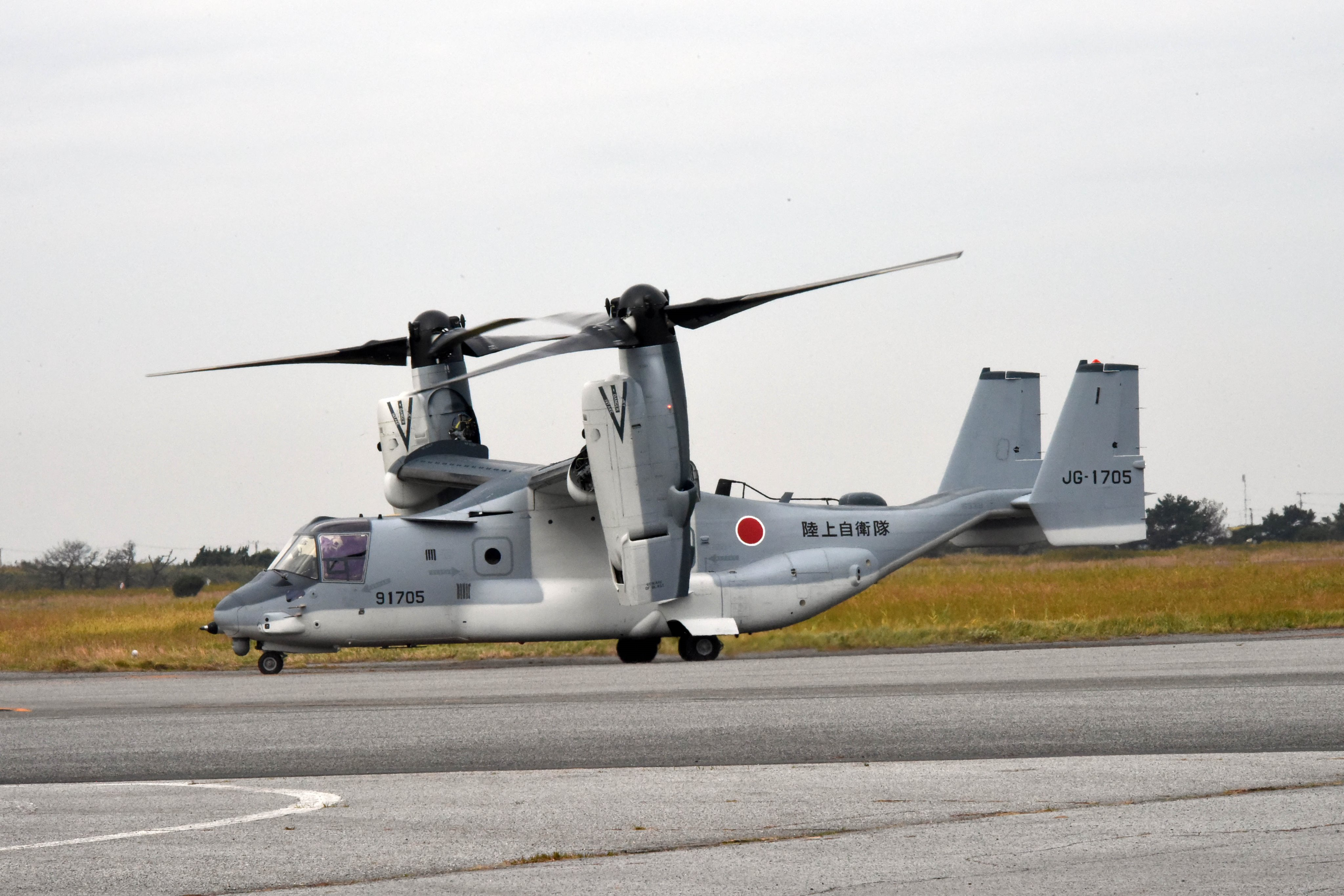
A Japanese V-22 Osprey in 2020

In September 2018, the Japanese Ministry of Defense decided to delay the deployment of the first five MV-22Bs it had received amid opposition and ongoing negotiations in the Saga Prefecture, where the aircraft are to be based. On 8 May 2020, the first two of the five aircraft were delivered to the JGSDF at Kisarazu Air Field after failing to reach an agreement with Saga prefecture residents. It is planned to eventually station some V-22s on board the Izumo-class helicopter destroyers. In September 2023, the first V-22 landings were conducted on the helicopter carrier Ise. The aircraft are planned to be based at Saga Airport in Kyushu starting in 2025 where the V-22s will be deployed together with Sikorsky Black Hawk and Apache Longbow helicopters in order to better defend Japan's southern Nansei Islands.

Following the fatal crash of a US Air Force CV-22 off Yakushima on 29 November 2023, Japan suspended flights of its 14 MV-22s. In early 2024 it was reported that the Japanese would resume flights of the V-22, and in March 2024 flights resumed.

=== Potential operators ===
The V-22 can carry a power-module of certain fighter jets such as the F-35, and also is noted it could be useful to nations with island chains or carriers. One question was why the U.S. Army did not procure the V-22 Osprey, and it was actually in the project at the start, but ended up heavily investing in traditional rotor craft such as the UH-60 Black Hawk and CH-47 Chinook. The V-22 production line is planned to be open to around 2026 to complete the orders for the Air Force, Navy, and Marine Corps.

Early on in the 2010s, some of the possible export buyers included Canada, Japan, United Arab Emirates, and the United Kingdom. Other potential interest came from India and Indonesia. In Europe, there was some interest on the continent from France, Spain, and Italy also. Canada is thought to have considered the V-22 for the Fixed Wing Search and Rescue (FWSAR), but it was not entered as the overall goals prioritized conventional aircraft; that program was won by the C-295, a fixed-wing medium transport.

The Air Force is also considering some additional V-22 for search and rescue, to supplement the HH-60W with a longer range aircraft, especially in the Indo-Pacific region where longer range is typically needed.

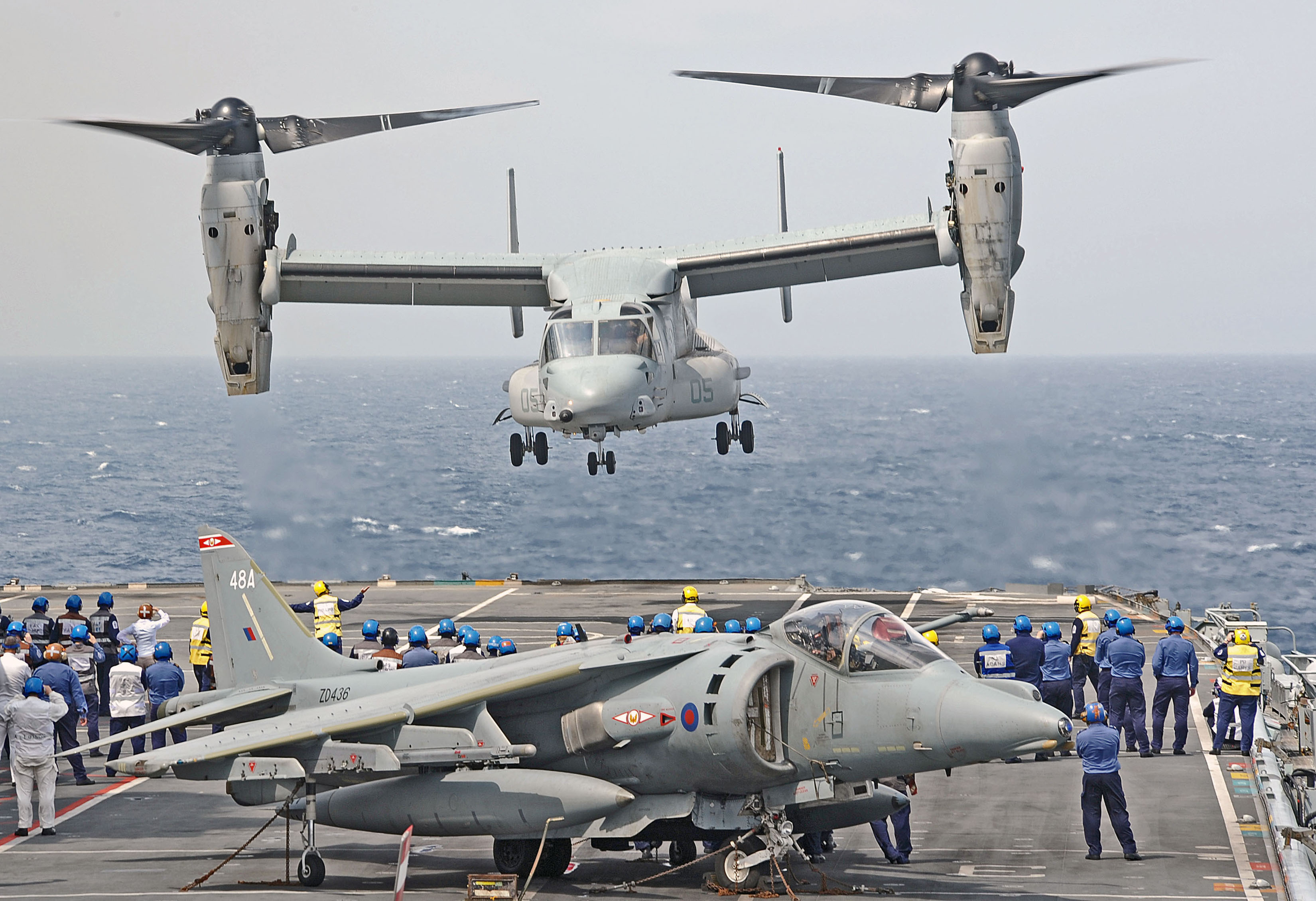
A V-22 lands on HMS Ark Royal during Exercise Auriga 10

==== France ====
France showed some interest in the V-22 especially for naval operations. It tested the V-22 in operations on their Mistral-class ships, and also their aircraft carrier Charles de Gaulle. The French had a two-year-long program to insure that the V-22 could operate from their Mistral-class vessels working with USMC V-22.

==== India ====
In 2015, the Indian Aviation Research Centre showed interest in acquiring four V-22s for personnel evacuation in hostile conditions, logistic supplies, and deployment of the Special Frontier Force in border areas. US V-22s performed relief operations after the April 2015 Nepal earthquake. The Indian Navy also studied the V-22 rather than the E-2D for airborne early warning and control to replace the short-range Kamov Ka-31. India is interested in purchasing six attack version V-22s for rapid troop insertion in border areas.

==== Indonesia ====
On 6 July 2020, the U.S. State Department announced that they had approved a possible Foreign Military Sale to Indonesia of eight Block C MV-22s and related equipment for an estimated cost of $2 billion (~$2.45 billion in 2025). The U.S. Defense Security Cooperation Agency notified Congress of this possible sale. The sale was approved, but in the end Indonesia decided against the purchase at that time due to the cost. It was noted that the V-22 could provide a unique logistical support to the island chain nation, but the concerns about purchase and maintenance costs were an issue.

==== Israel ====
On 22 April 2013, an agreement was signed to sell six V-22 to the Israeli Air Force. By the end of 2016, Israel had not ordered the V-22 and was instead interested in buying the CH-47 Chinook helicopter or the CH-53K helicopter. As of 2017, Israel had frozen its evaluation of the V-22, "with a senior defence source indicating that the tiltrotor is unable to perform some missions currently conducted using its Sikorsky CH-53 transport helicopters."

==== United Kingdom ====
The UK has monitored the V-22 program, and a combined UK/US study evaluated possible use. One of the more serious evaluations came in the late 2010s when it was considered to use them on the new Queen Elizabeth-class carriers. In the 2020s, it was thought to be one of the possible aircraft for the UK's New Medium Helicopter program but was not a finalist, a program that is seeking to replace the Westland Puma medium helicopter fleet.

The V-22 has been used on training exercises in the UK which has helped identify some issues, such as that the downwash can disrupt landing mats.

== Variants ==
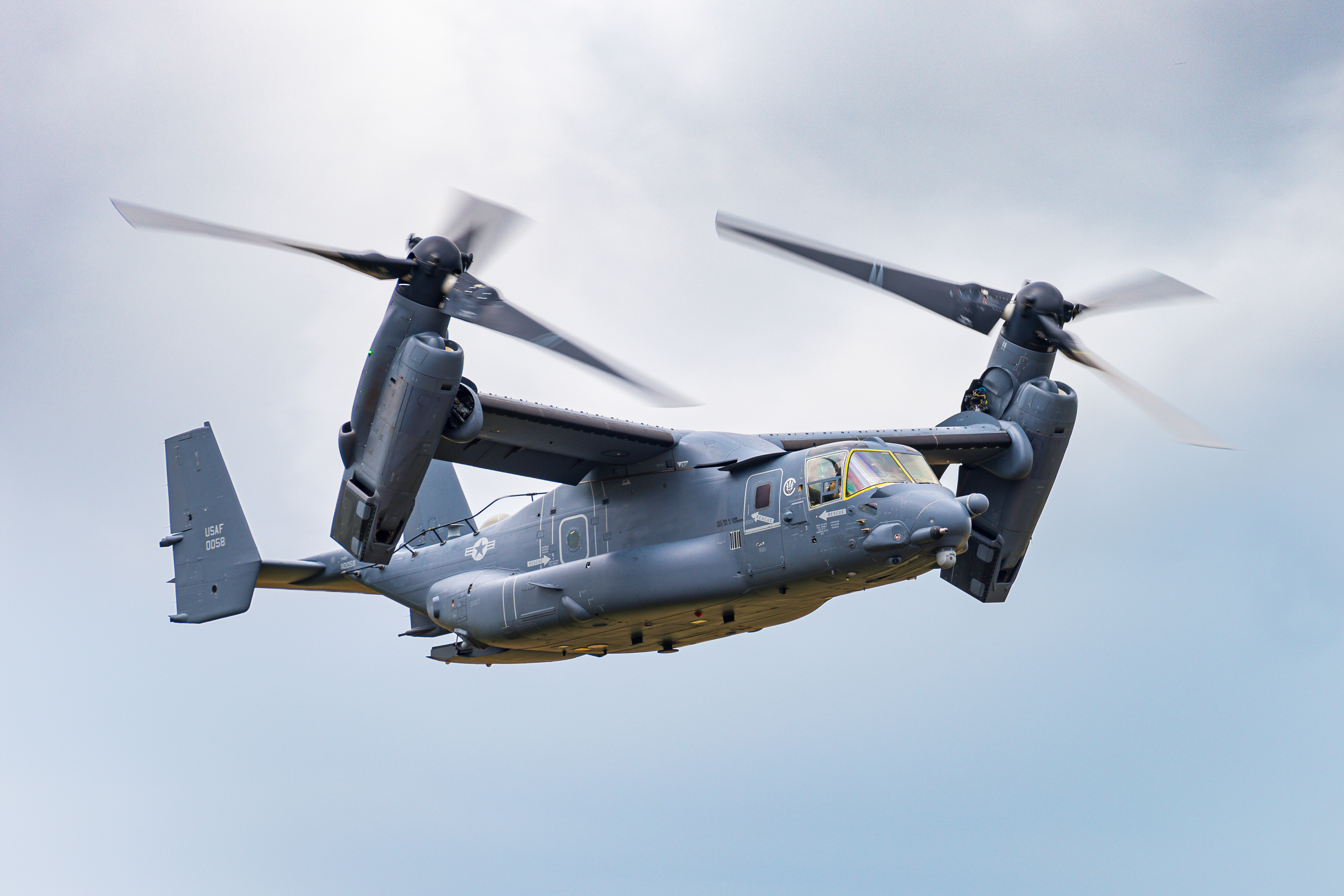
CV-22B Osprey with rotors in tilt

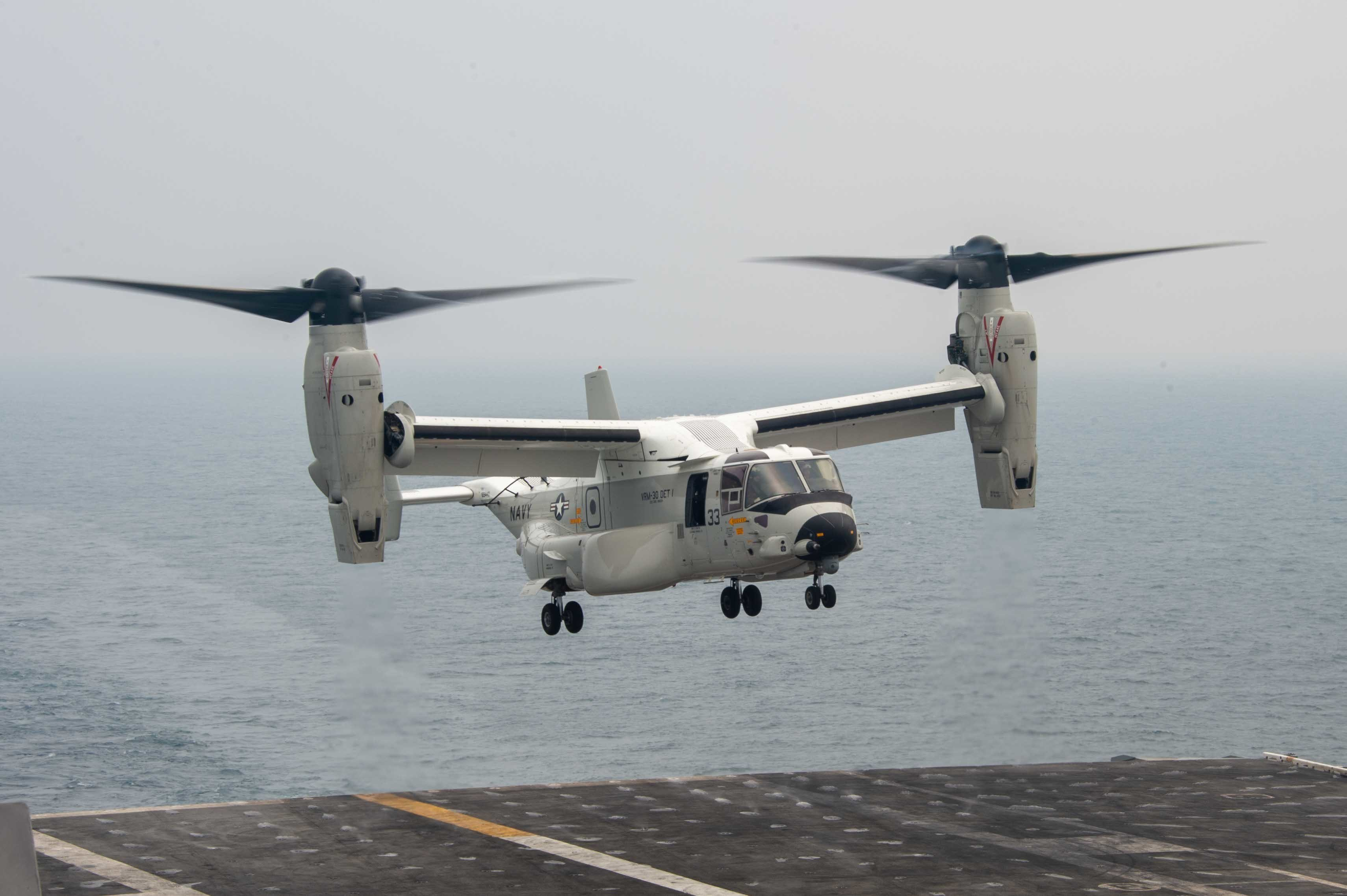
A CMV-22 lands on the deck of USS Carl Vinson

The preproduction model was called the V-22. USMC operates the MV-22B including the VIP V-22s, the USAF the CV-22B, and the Navy CMV-22B.

V-22 ("V-22A")
Pre-production full-scale development aircraft used for flight testing. These are unofficially considered A-variants after the 1993 redesign.

CV-22B
U.S. Air Force variant for the U.S. Special Operations Command. It conducts long-range special operations such as combat search and rescue (CSAR) missions and is equipped with extra wing fuel tanks, an AN/APQ-186 terrain-following radar, and other equipment such as the AN/ALQ-211, and AN/AAQ-24 Nemesis Directional Infrared Counter Measures. The fuel capacity is increased by 588 gallons (2,230 L) with two inboard wing tanks; three auxiliary tanks (200 or 430 gal; 760 or 1,630 L) can also be added in the cabin. The CV-22 replaced the MH-53 Pave Low.

MV-22B
U.S. Marine Corps variant. The Marine Corps is the lead service in the V-22's development. The Marine Corps variant is an assault transport for troops, equipment and supplies, capable of operating from ships or expeditionary airfields ashore. It replaced the Marine Corps' CH-46E and CH-53D fleets.

CMV-22B
U.S. Navy variant for the carrier onboard delivery role, replacing the C-2. Similar to the MV-22B but includes an extended-range fuel system, a high-frequency radio, and a public address system.

EV-22
Proposed airborne early warning and control variant. The Royal Navy studied this variant as a replacement for its fleet of carrier-based Sea King ASaC.7 helicopters.

HV-22
The U.S. Navy considered an HV-22 to provide combat search and rescue, delivery and retrieval of special warfare teams along with fleet logistic support transport. It chose the MH-60S for this role in 2001.

SV-22
Proposed anti-submarine warfare variant. The U.S. Navy studied the SV-22 in the 1980s to replace S-3 and SH-2 aircraft.

== Operators ==
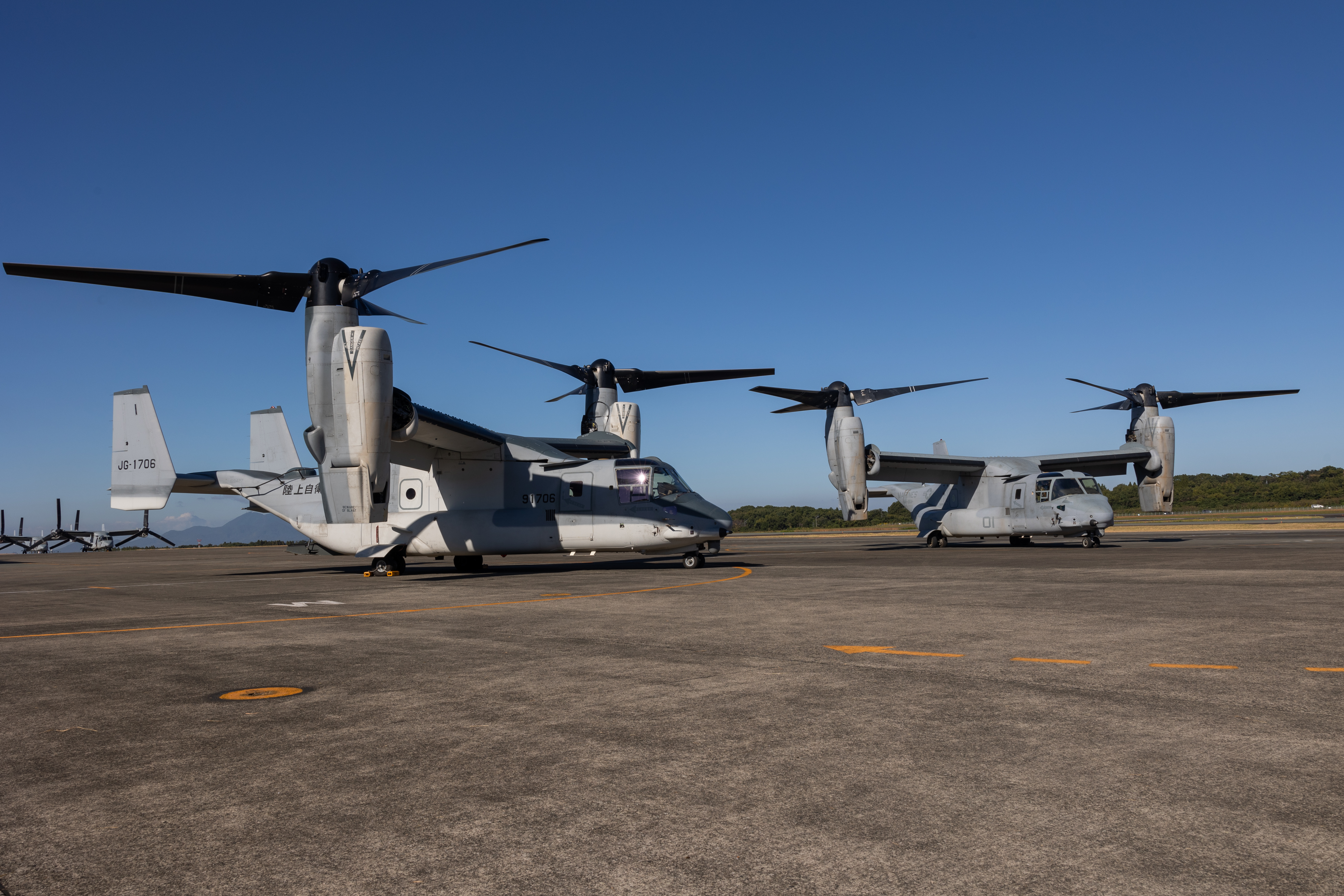
JGSDF V-22 and USMC MV-22B at Kengun

Japan

- Japan Ground Self-Defense Force (14 delivered, 3 on order as of Dec 2023)

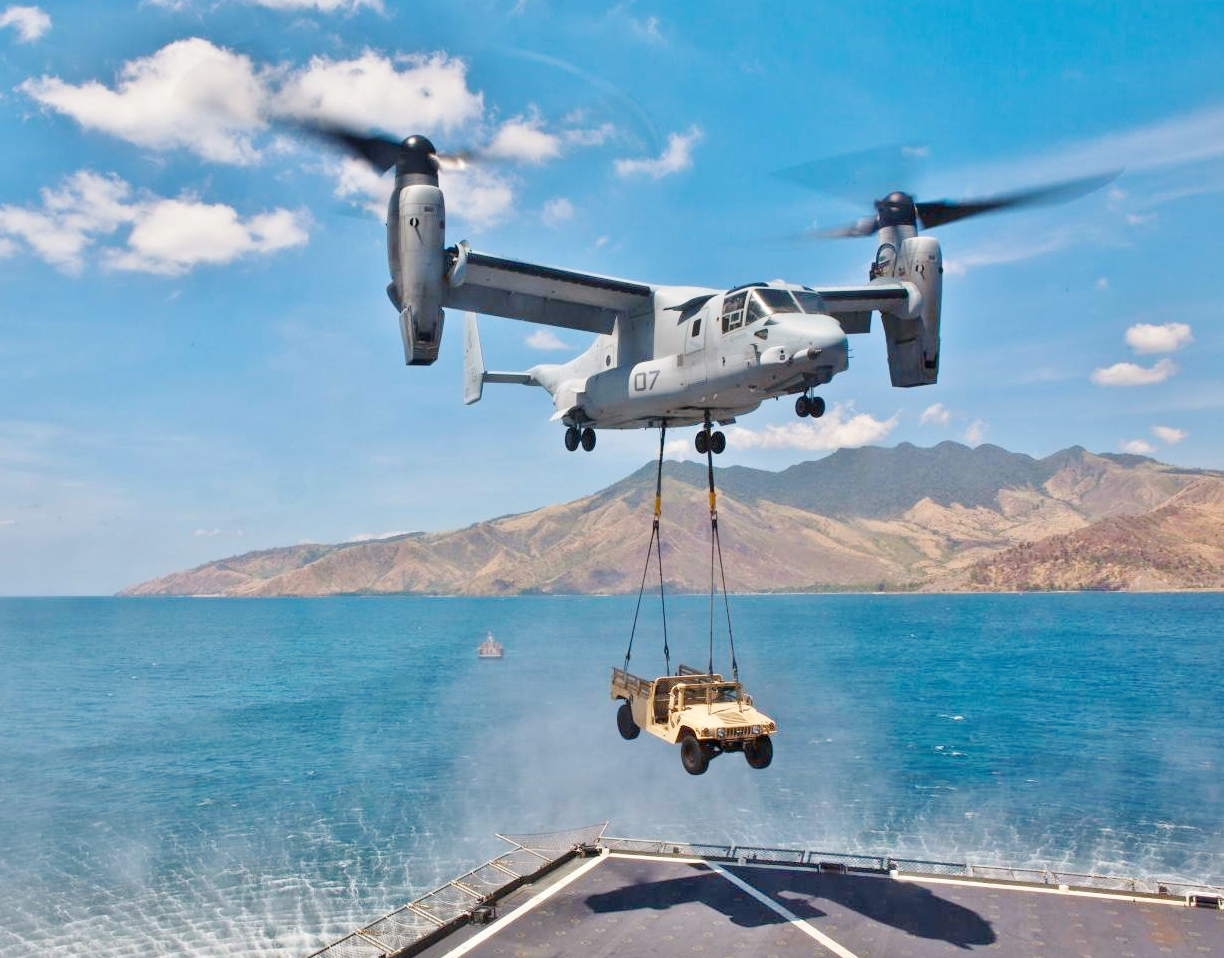
An MV-22 delivers a Humvee to USNS Sacagawea

United States

- United States Air Force
  - 7th Special Operations Squadron
  - 8th Special Operations Squadron
  - 20th Special Operations Squadron
  - 21st Special Operations Squadron
  - 71st Special Operations Squadron
  - 249th Special Operations Squadron - Florida Air National Guard associate unit to 1st Special Operations Wing
  - 418th Flight Test Squadron

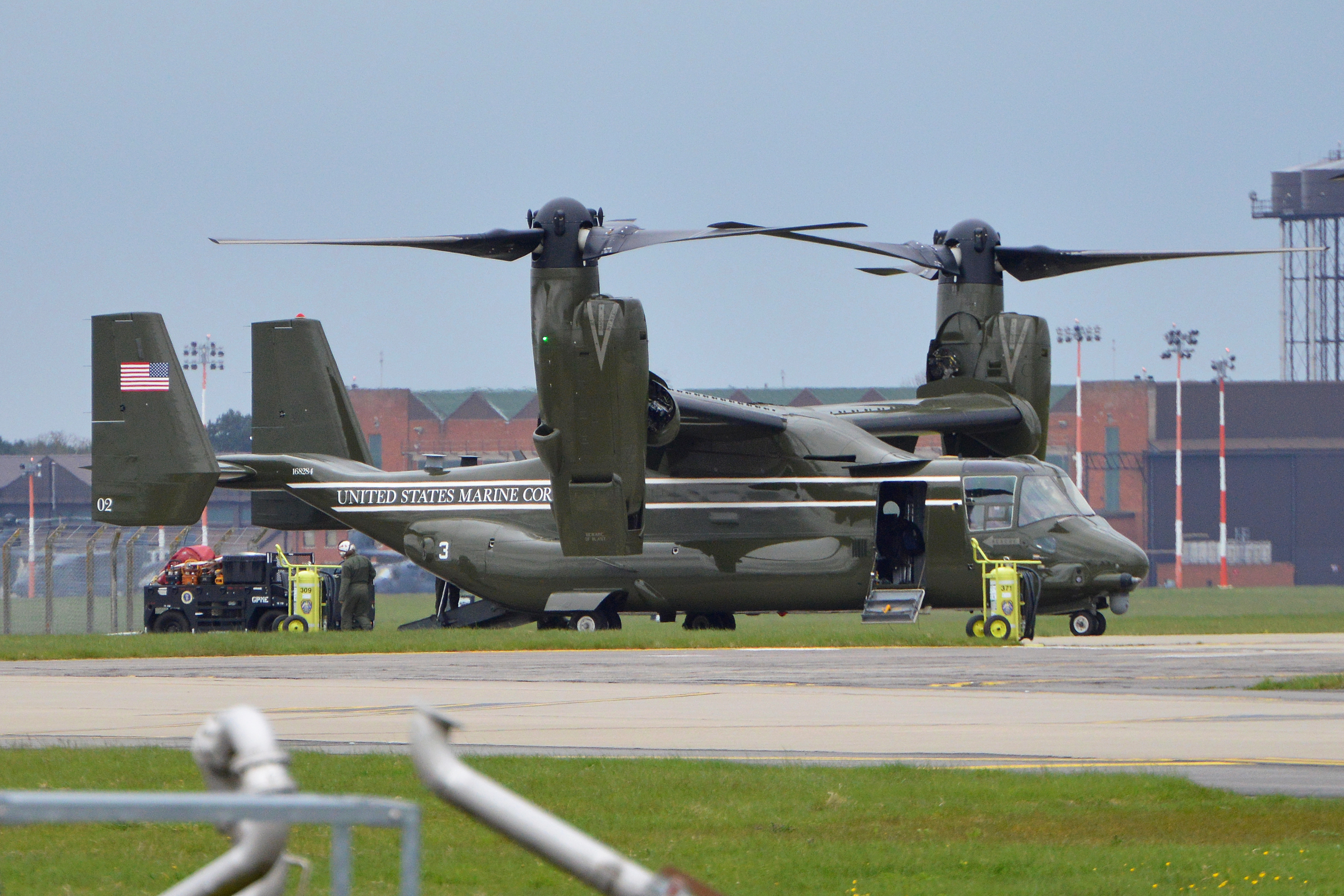
A MV-22B of HMX-1 at RAF Mildenhall in 2016

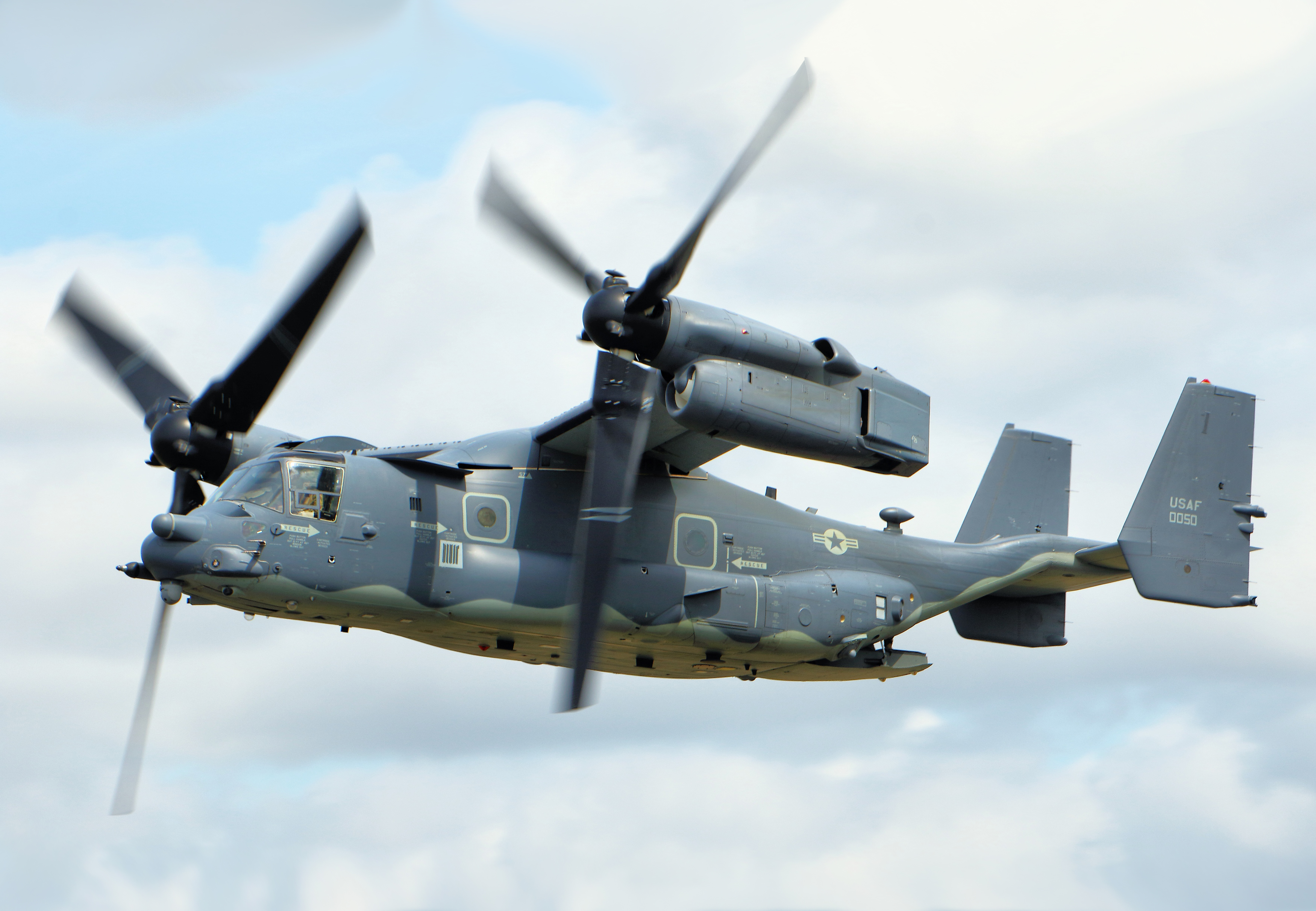
A CV-22 Osprey over RIAT in 2015

- United States Marine Corps
  - HMX-1
  - VMX-1 (formerly VMX-22)
  - VMM-161
  - VMM-162
  - VMM-163
  - VMM-165
  - VMM-166
  - VMMT-204
  - VMM-261
  - VMM-263
  - VMM-264
  - VMM-265
  - VMM-266
  - VMM-268
  - VMM-362
  - VMM-363
  - VMM-365
  - VMM-561
  - VMM-764 - Marine Air Reserve
  - VMM-774 - Marine Air Reserve
- United States Navy – 44 CMV-22Bs ordered, with deliveries started in 2020.
  - HX-21
  - VRM-30
  - VRM-40
  - VRM-50

== Accidents ==
The V-22 Osprey has had 17 hull-loss accidents with a total of 65 fatalities as of 22 April 2026. During testing from 1991 to 2000, there were four crashes causing 30 fatalities. As of 2023, the V-22 has had 13 crashes which caused 32 fatalities since becoming operational in 2007. The aircraft's accident history has generated controversy over its perceived safety issues. Following the November 2023 crash in Japan, the Osprey was grounded for three months.

In Japan, perceptions of the Osprey's poor safety record have spurred protests against deployments.

== Aircraft on display ==
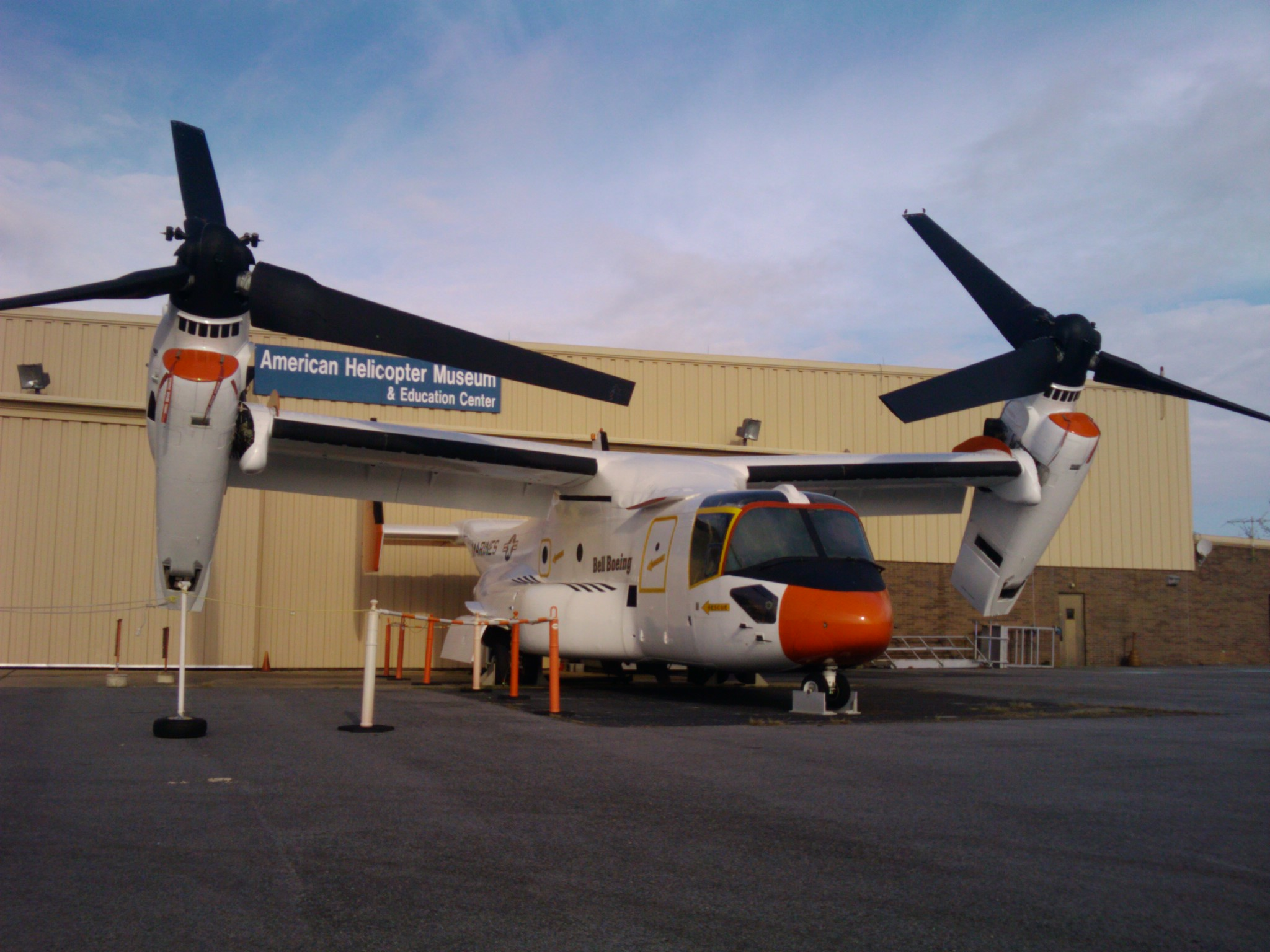
A V-22 at the American Helicopter Museum & Education Center

- 163911 – MV-22B on display at the Aviation Memorial at Marine Corps Air Station New River in Jacksonville, North Carolina.
- 163913 – V-22A on display at the American Helicopter Museum & Education Center in West Chester, Pennsylvania.
- 99-0021 (formerly 164939) – CV-22B on display at the National Museum of the United States Air Force at Wright-Patterson AFB in Dayton, Ohio.
- 164940 – MV-22B on display at the Patuxent River Naval Air Museum in Lexington Park, Maryland.

== Specifications (MV-22B) ==

V-22 combat radius in Iraq CH-46E smaller combat radius

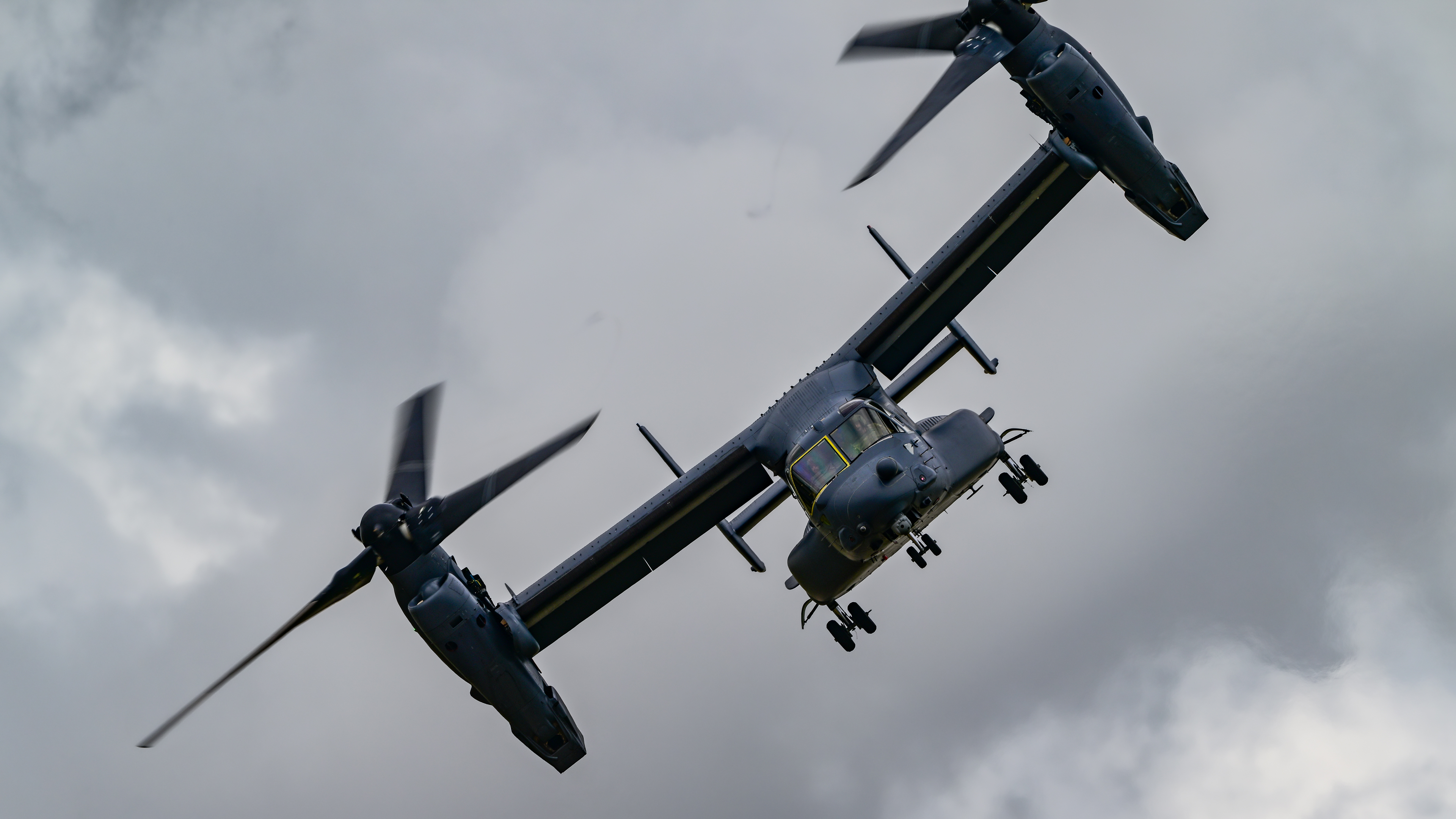
V-22 at RIAT 2023

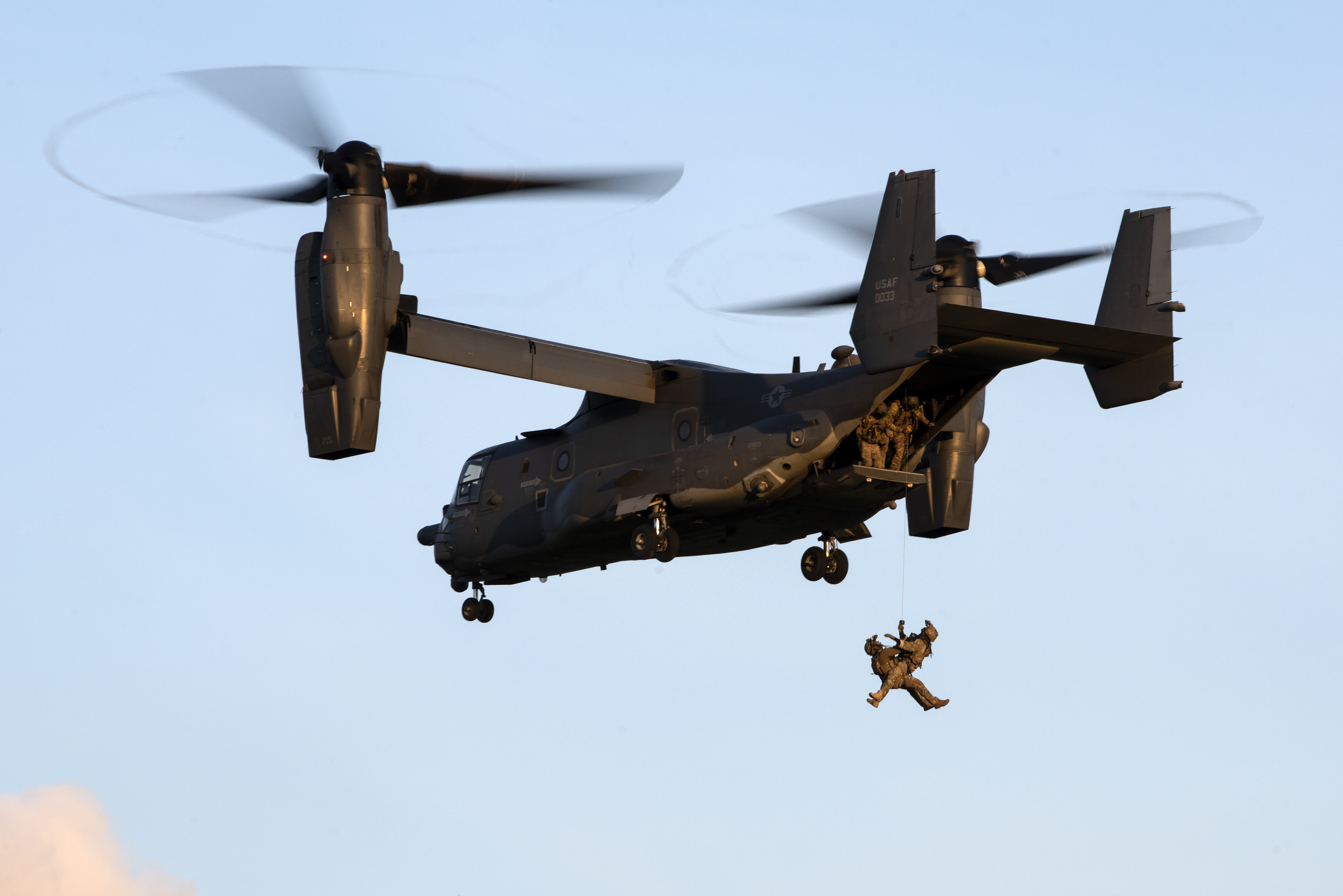
CV-22B on training exercise of the Special Tactics Squadron on a hoist, in the UK in 2021

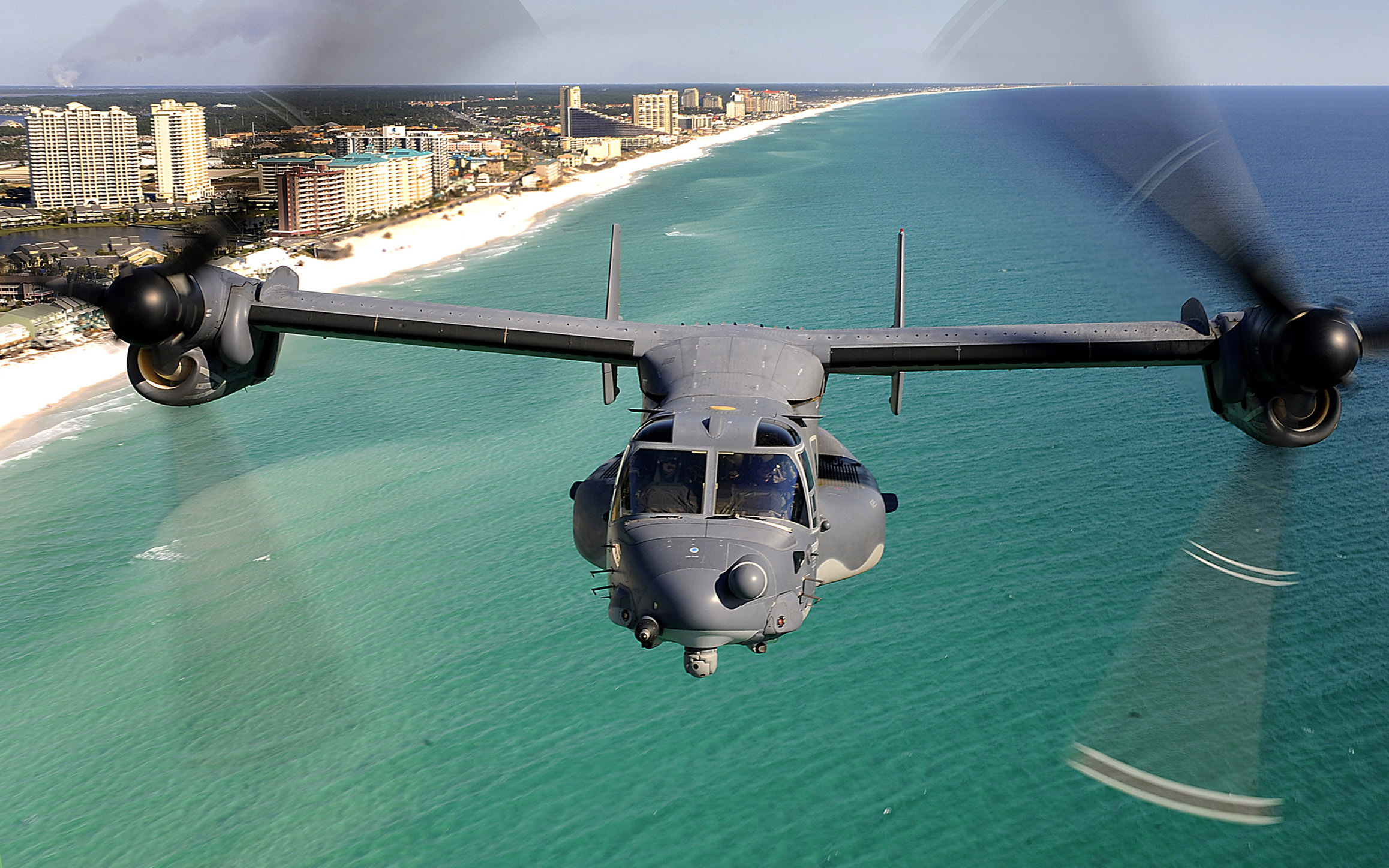
A CV-22 of 8th Special Operations Squadron flies over Florida's Emerald Coast.

Data from Norton, Boeing, Bell Guide, Naval Air Systems Command, and USAF CV-22 fact sheet

General characteristics

- Crew: 3–4 (pilot, copilot and 1 or 2 flight engineers/crew chiefs/loadmasters/gunners)
- Capacity:
  - 24 troops (seated), 32 troops (floor loaded), or
  - 20,000 pounds (9,100 kg) of internal cargo, or up to 15,000 pounds (6,800 kg) of external cargo (dual hook)
  - 1× M1161 Growler light internally transportable ground vehicle
- Length: 57 ft 4 in (17.48 m) Length folded: 62 ft 7.6 in (19.091 m)
- Wingspan: 45 ft 10 in (13.97 m)
- Width: 84 ft 6.8 in (25.776 m) including rotors
- Width folded: 18 ft 5 in (5.61 m)
- Height: 22 ft 1 in (6.73 m) engine nacelles vertical;

17 ft 7.8 in (5 m) to top of tailfins

- Height folded: 18 ft 1 in (5.51 m)
- Wing area: 301.4 sq ft (28.00 m^{2})
- Empty weight: 31,818 lb (14,432 kg)
- Operating weight, empty: 32,623 lb (14,798 kg)
- Gross weight: 39,500 lb (17,917 kg)
- Combat weight: 42,712 lb (19,374 kg)
- Maximum take-off weight VTOL: 52,600 lb (23,859 kg)
- Maximum take-off weight STOL: 57,000 lb (25,855 kg)
- Maximum take-off weight STOL, ferry: 60,500 lb (27,442 kg)
- Fuel capacity: Ferry maximum: 4,451 US gal (3,706 imp gal; 16,850 L) of JP-4 / JP-5 / JP-8 to MIL-T-5624
- Powerplant: 2 × Rolls-Royce T406-AD-400 turboprop/turboshaft engines, 6,150 hp (4,590 kW) each maximum at 15,000 rpm at sea level, 59 °F (15 °C)

5,890 hp (4,392 kW) maximum continuous at 15,000 rpm at sea level, 59 °F (15 °C)

- Main rotor diameter: 2 × 38 ft 1 in (11.61 m)
- Main rotor area: 2,268 sq ft (210.7 m^{2}) 3-bladed

Performance

- Maximum speed: 275 kn (316 mph, 509 km/h)

305 kn (565 km/h; 351 mph) at 15,000 ft (4,600 m)

- Stall speed: 110 kn (130 mph, 200 km/h)
- Range: 879 nmi (1,012 mi, 1,628 km)
- Combat range: 390 nmi (450 mi, 720 km)
- Ferry range: 2,230 nmi (2,570 mi, 4,130 km)
- Service ceiling: 25,000 ft (7,600 m)
- g limits: +4 max / −1 min
- Maximum glide ratio: 4.5:1
- Rate of climb: 2,320–4,000 ft/min (11.8–20.3 m/s)
- Wing loading: 20.9 lb/sq ft (102 kg/m^{2}) at 47,500 lb (21,546 kg)
- Power/mass: 0.259 hp/lb (0.426 kW/kg)

Armament

- 1 × 7.62 mm (.308 in) M240 machine gun or .50 in (12.7 mm) M2 Browning machine gun on ramp, removable
- 1 × 7.62 mm (.308 in) GAU-17 minigun, belly-mounted, retractable, video remote control in the Remote Guardian System [optional]

Avionics

- AN/ARC-182 VHF/UHF radio
- KY-58 VHF/UHF encryption
- ANDVT HF encryption
- AN/AAR-47 Missile Approach Warning System
- AN/AYK-14 Mission Computers
- APQ-168 Multifunction radar
- Directional Infrared Counter Measures (DIRCM)

== See also ==
- Canadair CL-84
- LTV XC-142

Related development

- AgustaWestland AW609
- Bell Boeing Quad TiltRotor
- Bell MV-75
- Bell XV-15

Aircraft of comparable role, configuration, and era

- Mil Mi-30

Related lists

- List of military aircraft of the United States
- List of VTOL aircraft
