= Ed Doherty Award =

High school football award in Arizona

- Awarded for: Given to the best player at the high school level of football
- Location: Arizona
- Country: United States
- Presented by: The Active 20-30 Clubs of Arizona (1987–2012); Grand Canyon State Gridiron Club (2017–present)

History
- First award: 1987
- Most recent: Dezmen Roebuck

The Ed Doherty Award is an honor given annually to the top high school football player in Arizona. The award was established in 1987 and named after legendary former Arizona and Arizona State coach Ed Doherty. It is awarded by the Active 20-30 Clubs of Arizona. After a hiatus from 2013 to 2016, it was revived by the Grand Canyon State Gridiron Club.

== Award winners ==
Year	Player	Position	High School	College	Ref.
1987	Kevin Galbreath	RB	Maryvale	Arizona State	
1988	Eric Drage	WR/DB	Santa Rita	BYU	
1989	Mike Ciasca	OL	Sahuaro	Arizona	
1990	Mario Bates	RB	Amphitheater	Arizona State	
1991	Sam Salts	WR/DB/K	St. Mary's	Mesa Community College Western New Mexico State	
1992	Mike Mitchell	RB	Brophy	Stanford	
1993	Kevin Schmidtke	RB	Mountain View (Pima County, Arizona)	Arizona	
1994	Scooter Sprotte	RB/LB	Lakeside	Arizona	
1995	Ryan Kealy	QB	St. Mary's (2)	Arizona State	
1996	Adam Hall	RB	Corona Del Sol	Arizona State	
1997	Todd Heap	TE	Mountain View (Mesa, Arizona)	Arizona State	
1998	Bobby Wade	RB/WR/DB	Desert Vista	Arizona	
1999	John Beck	QB	Mountain View (Mesa, Arizona) (2)	BYU	
2000	Mike Bell	RB	Tolleson	Arizona	
2001	Mike Nixon	QB/DB/K	Sunnyslope	Arizona State	
2002	Kyle Caldwell	DE/FB	Saguaro	Arizona State	
2003	Zach Miller	TE	Desert Vista (2)	Arizona State	
2004	Chris McGaha	WR/DB	Moon Valley	Arizona State	
2005	Kyle Williams	RB/WR	Chaparral	Arizona State	
2006	Everson Griffen	DE/RB	Agua Fria	USC	
2007	Tim Ruben	QB	Saguaro (2)	Boise State	
2008	Adam Hall	WR/DB	Palo Verde	Arizona	
2009	Ramon Abreu	LB	Marcos de Niza	Arizona State	
2010	Teddy Ruben	QB	Saguaro (3)	Scottsdale Community College Troy	
2011	Ka'Deem Carey	RB	Canyon del Oro	Arizona	
2011	Kelvin Fisher	RB/DB	Higley	Arkansas UTEP	
2011	Brett Hundley	QB	Chandler	UCLA	
2011	Izzy Marshall	LB	Mountain Pointe	Arizona State	
2011	Teddy Ruben (2)	QB	Saguaro (4)	Scottsdale Community College Troy	
2012	Ryan Finley	QB	Paradise Valley	Boise State NC State	
2012	Cole Luke	DB	Hamilton	Notre Dame	
2012	Jalen Ortiz	RB/DB	Centennial	UCLA Wyoming	
2012	Jake Roh	WR/LB	Chaparral (2)	Boise State	
2012	Tyler Williams	WR/DB	Ironwood Ridge	Air Force	
2012	Priest Willis	DB	Marcos de Niza (2)	UCLA Texas A&M	
2013	Not Awarded				
2014	Not Awarded				
2015	Not Awarded				
2016	Not Awarded				
2017	Brock Purdy	QB	Perry	Iowa State	
2018	Bijan Robinson	RB	Salpointe	Texas	
2019	Bijan Robinson	RB	Salpointe	Texas	
2020	Ty Thompson	QB	Mesquite	Oregon Tulane	
2021	Nicco Marchiol	QB	Hamilton (2)	West Virginia Northwestern	
2022	Devon Dampier	QB	Saguaro (5)	New Mexico Utah	
2023	Navi Bruzon	QB	Liberty	Arizona State Highland Community College CSU Pueblo	
2024	Dezmen Roebuck	WR/DB	Marana	Washington	
2025	Roye Oliver III	WR	Hamilton (3)	USC	

Beginning in 2024, a female winner was also recognized for flag football.

Year	Player	Position	High School	College	Ref.
2024	Samaya Taylor-Jenkins	WR/S	Hamilton		
2024	Katelyn Jewell	QB/S	Canyon View	Florida Gateway College	
2025	Samaya Taylor-Jenkins (2)	WR/S	Hamilton (2)		
