= 2000 Marana V-22 crash =

Arizona plane crash

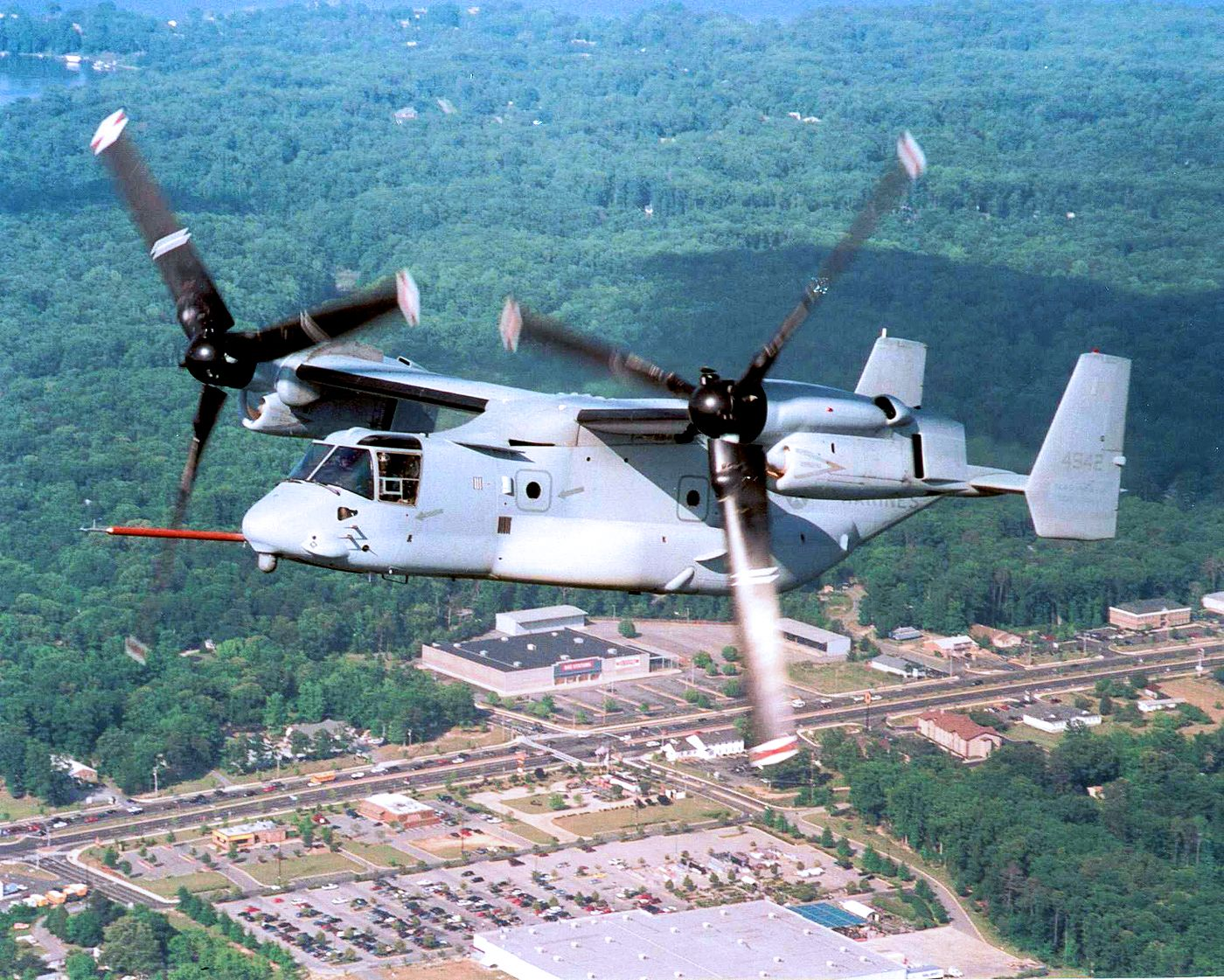
- A V-22 Osprey similar to the aircraft that crashed in Marana, Arizona.

Accident
- Date: 8 April 2000
- Summary: Vortex ring state
- Site: Marana Northwest Regional Airport; 32°24′34.40″N 111°13′06.20″W

Aircraft
- Aircraft type: Bell Boeing V-22 Osprey
- Operator: United States Marine Corps
- Call sign: NIGHTHAWK 72
- Passengers: 15
- Crew: 4
- Fatalities: 19
- Injuries: 0
- Survivors: 0

On 8 April 2000, a V-22 Osprey aircraft operated by the United States Marine Corps crashed during a night training exercise at Marana Regional Airport near Tucson, Arizona. The crash killed all 19 U.S. Marines on board and intensified debate about the reliability of the Osprey.

It was later determined that the aircraft had entered an aerodynamic condition known as vortex ring state, which resulted from a high rate of descent compounded by pilot error. As a result of the investigation findings, the V-22 was subject to further redesign, and eventually entered operational service in 2007.

== Accident ==
On 8 April 2000, a V-22 Osprey, callsign Nighthawk 72, being flown by Major Brooks Gruber and Lieutenant Colonel John Brow was conducting a nighttime training exercise simulating a combatant evacuation at Marana Northwest Regional Airport in Marana, Arizona about twenty miles northwest of Tucson. The V-22 was carrying 15 passengers, all U.S. Marines from 3rd Battalion, 5th Marines, and was flying in a formation of four V-22s when the accident occurred. Two of the V-22s in the formation were actually carrying out the exercise while the other two were observing their performance.

As they approached the landing site, the pilots of the mishap V-22 realized they were 2,000 feet (600 m) above the required descent altitude and reduced power. As Lt. Colonel Brow maneuvered the aircraft to land, the Osprey entered an erratic roll, turning on its back and slamming into the ground nose first. All 19 Marines aboard the aircraft were killed. The second V-22 also made a hard landing but suffered no fatalities.

== Investigation ==
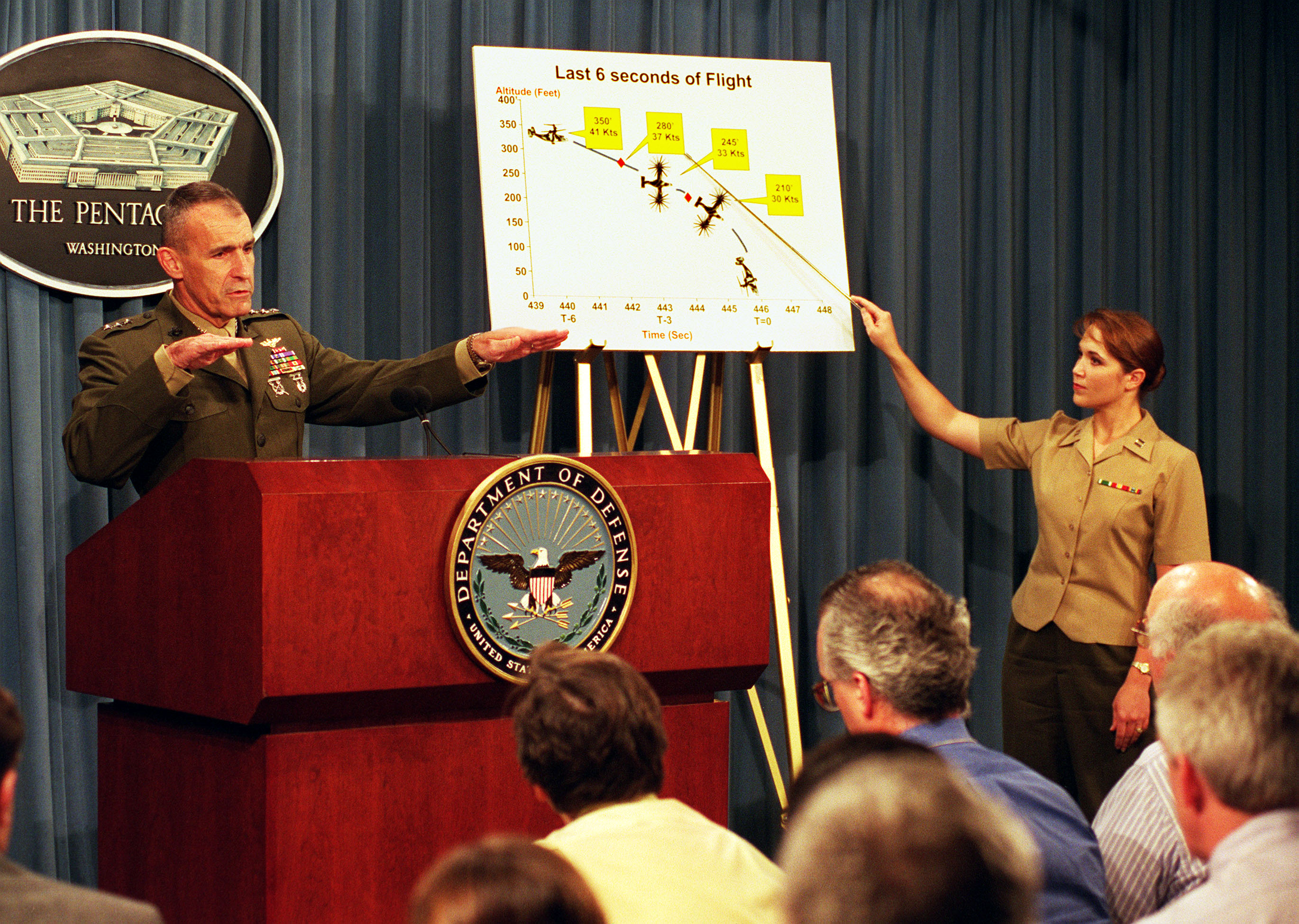
Lt. General Fred McCorkle briefs reporters on the investigation in the April 2000 V-22 crash.

Shortly after the crash an investigation was commissioned to determine its cause. The investigation ruled out most possible causes and narrowed in on the aircraft's rate of descent as the primary cause. Investigators compared the mishap aircraft's actual rate of descent with the V-22 flight manual's required rate of descent and found discrepancies. As the V-22 descended to land it was dropping at 2,000 feet (600 m) per minute, well above the prescribed 800 feet (240 m) per minute. The speed caused the aircraft to enter an aerodynamic condition known as vortex ring state. In this condition, a vortex envelops the rotor, causing an aircraft to lose lift, in essence descending in its own downwash.

After two months of investigation by the Marine Corps Judge Advocate General a final report was released which absolved the aircraft itself of any mechanical faults and instead pinned the blame on the exceptionally high rate of descent coupled with human error.

The report read:

"This mishap appears not to be the result of any design, material or maintenance factor specific to tilt ... rotors. Its primary cause, that of an MV-22 entering a Vortex Ring State (Power Settling) and/or blade stall condition is not peculiar to tilt rotors. The contributing factors to the mishap, a steep approach with a high rate of descent and slow airspeed, poor aircrew coordination and diminished situational awareness are also not particular to tilt rotors."

The final arbiter in the debate is the determination in 2016 by then Deputy Defense Secretary Robert Work that vindicates the pilots in the crash, a battle that took 16 years.

Bob Work stated:

"Finally, Deputy Defense Secretary Bob Work -- himself a former Marine -- reviewed the evidence and issued a letter which read, "I disagree that the pilots' drive to accomplish the mission was 'the fatal factor' that contributed to the accident."

== Aftermath ==
The crash resulted in a two-month moratorium on V-22 test flights and further postponed its entry into operational military service. The Department of Defense Director of Operational Test and Evaluation wrote a report seven months after the crash stating the Osprey was not "operationally suitable, primarily because of reliability, maintainability, availability, human factors and interoperability issues", and implored more research to be conducted into the Osprey's susceptibility to vortex ring state. Nevertheless, a panel, convened by Secretary of Defense William Cohen to review the V-22 program, recommended its continuance despite many issues with safety and reliability. As a result, the procurement budget was decreased, but the research and development budget was increased. Eight months later, another MV-22 Osprey, conducting training near Jacksonville, North Carolina, crashed, killing 4 Marines.
