= Dezmen Roebuck =

American football player

No. 2 – Washington Huskies
- Position: Wide receiver
- Class: Sophomore

Personal information
- Listed height: 5 ft 11 in (1.80 m)
- Listed weight: 184 lb (83 kg)

Career information
- High school: Marana (Marana, Arizona)
- College: Washington (2025–present)

Awards and highlights
- Ed Doherty Award (2024)
- Stats at ESPN

Dezmen Roebuck is an American college football wide receiver for the Washington Huskies.

== Early life ==
Roebuck attended Marana High School in Marana, Arizona. He played wide receiver and cornerback in high school. As a freshman, Roebuck had 44 receptions for 502 yards and as a sophomore was the 5A Sonoran Regional Offensive Player of the Year after recording 92 receptions for 1,274 yards and 13 touchdowns. As a junior he was the 5A Southern Region Player of the Year after finishing with 121 receptions for 1,332 yards and eight touchdowns on offense and 48 tackles and four interceptions on defense. As a senior he was again the 5A Southern Region Player of the Year and was named the Arizona Gatorade Football Player of the Year after catching 95 passes for 1,131 yards with 14 touchdowns and 51 tackles with four interceptions. Roebuck finished his career with a state record 352 career receptions. He committed to the University of Washington to play college football.

== College career ==
Roebuck earned a starting job during his true freshman year at Washington in 2025.
