= Ed Doherty (American football) =

American football player and coach (1918–2000)

Biographical details
- Born: July 25, 1918; Andover, Massachusetts, U.S.
- Died: January 2, 2000 (aged 81); Tucson, Arizona, U.S.

Playing career
- 1941–1943: Boston College
- Position: Quarterback

Coaching career (HC unless noted)
- 1946: Notre Dame (assistant)
- 1947–1950: Arizona State
- 1951: Rhode Island
- 1952: Punchard HS (MA)
- 1953–1954: Lawrence HS (MA)
- 1956: Philadelphia Eagles (assistant)
- 1957–1958: Arizona
- 1959–1961: Xavier
- 1964: St. Augustine HS (CA)
- 1965–1970: St. Mary's HS (AZ)
- 1971–1975: Holy Cross
- 1978–1982: Salpointe Catholic HS (AZ)

Head coaching record
- Overall: 67–83–3 (college)
- Bowls: 0–2

Accomplishments and honors

Championships
- 2 Arizona Class AA High School (1967–1968)

Awards
- Arizona High School Football Coach of the Year (1967)

Edward A. Doherty (July 25, 1918 – January 2, 2000) was an American football player and coach. He served as head football coach at Arizona State University (1947–1950), the University of Rhode Island (1951), the University of Arizona (1957–1958), Xavier University (1959–1961), and the College of the Holy Cross (1971–1975), compiling a career college football record of 67–83–3. He is the only person to serve as head coach for in-state rivals Arizona and Arizona State.

== Playing career ==
Doherty played quarterback at Boston College from 1941 to 1943. He was nicknamed "The Brain" for his innovative style. When most of the Boston College coaching staff left for military duty in 1943, Doherty, then a senior, was a finalist for the job of head coach. The job would eventually go to line coach Moody Sarno. Doherty was drafted by the Washington Redskins in the fifth round (39th overall) of the 1944 NFL draft, but instead joined the United States Navy.

== Coaching career ==
After one season as an assistant at Notre Dame in 1946, Doherty became head coach at Arizona State, where he compiled a 25–17 record from 1947 to 1950. He left after ASU five days after defeating rival Arizona, 47–13, because he felt that he didn't have enough job security.

In 1951, he coached at Rhode Island on a temporary basis after head coach Hal Kopp was called to Army active duty. He compiled a 3–5 record in his only season as coach. From 1952 to 1954, Doherty coached high school football at Punchard High School (1952) and Lawrence High School in Massachusetts (1953–1954). He returned to college football in 1957 after one season as an assistant with the Philadelphia Eagles. From 1957 to 1958, Doherty coached at Arizona, where he compiled a 4–15–1 record. Unlikely to be brought back for a third season, Doherty resigned and became head coach of Xavier University.

After two years out of the game, Doherty returned to coaching in 1964 as the head coach of St. Augustine High School in San Diego, California. From 1965 to 1970 he was head coach at St. Mary's High School in Phoenix, Arizona. From 1967 to 1969, Doherty coached St. Mary's to three straight state championship games, winning in 1967 and 1968. From 1971 to 1975, he coached at Holy Cross, where he compiled a 20–31–2 record. After leaving Holy Cross, Doherty returned to Arizona, where he coached Salpointe Catholic High School from 1978 to 1982 and was the school's athletic director until 1990. He coached the Lancers to the 1981 state championship game.

== Honors ==
In 1991, Salpointe Catholic named their new stadium in honor of Doherty. The Active 20-30 Clubs of Arizona also honored Doherty by naming their high school football player of the year trophy the Ed Doherty Award.

== Head coaching record ==
=== College ===
Year	Team	Overall	Conference	Standing	Bowl/playoffs
Arizona State Sun Devils (Border Conference) (1947–1950)
1947	Arizona State	4–7	3–4	6th	
1948	Arizona State	5–5	3–2	T–3rd	
1949	Arizona State	7–3	4–1	2nd	L Salad
1950	Arizona State	9–2	4–1	2nd	L Salad
Arizona State:		25–17	14–8		
Rhode Island Rams (Yankee Conference) (1951)
1951	Rhode Island	3–5	1–3	5th	
Rhode Island:		3–5	1–3		
Arizona Wildcats (Border Conference) (1957–1958)
1957	Arizona	1–8–1	0–4	T–5th	
1958	Arizona	3–7	2–1	3rd	
Arizona:		4–15–1	2–5		
Xavier Musketeers (Independent) (1959–1961)
1959	Xavier	4–6			
1960	Xavier	5–5			
1961	Xavier	6–4			
Xavier:		15–15			
Holy Cross Crusaders (NCAA University Division / Division I independent) (1971–1975)
1971	Holy Cross	4–6			
1972	Holy Cross	5–4–1			
1973	Holy Cross	5–6			
1974	Holy Cross	5–5–1			
1975	Holy Cross	1–10			
Holy Cross:		20–31–2			
Total:		67–83–3			
