= Dezmen =

Dezmen is a masculine given name. Notable people with the name include:

- Dezmen Roebuck, American college football wide receiver
- Dezmen Southward (born 1990), American former professional football player
