= Julio Linares =

Panamanian diplomat and politician

Julio E. Linares
- Born: August 7, 1930; Panama City, Panama
- Died: October 27, 1993 (aged 63); New York City, United States
- Education: University of Panama, Central University of Madrid
- Occupations: Diplomat, politician, lawyer

Julio E. Linares (August 7, 1930 – October 27, 1993) was a Panamanian diplomat and politician.

== Early life and education ==
He was born in Panama City, Panama. He studied law and political sciences from the University of Panama, Panama, and held a Doctor of Law degree from the Central University of Madrid, Spain. He created the diploma training in law and international politics at the Free International University of Social Studies in Rome, Italy. He was the chair of public international law professor at the University of Panama. He served the University of Panama in various capacities such as the secretary, deputy dean and interim dean.

== Career ==
He held various important positions in several institutions. He was a member of the National Assembly, main member of the National Council of Foreign Affairs, president of the directive board of the Institute of housing and urbanism and the Gaming Control Board, Minister Counselor of the permanent delegation of Panama at the UN, Governor of Panama to the World Bank, the principal representative of Panama to the Inter-American Economic and Social Council, and at the V Assembly of Governors of the Bank of Inter-American Development, he was elected President of the same. He was Minister of Foreign Affairs, Minister of Finance and Treasury and acting Minister of Labour and Social Welfare.

He was also a partner of the law firms Tapia, Linares and Alfaro, president of the Union Club, president of the Nationalist Party, secretary general of the Instituto Hispano-Luso - Americano de Derecho Internacional, member of the International Law Association, American Society of International Law, Panamanian Academy of law, National Bar Association, Panamanian Institute of Hispanic Culture, Bolivarian Society of Panama, Latin American Institute for advanced studies, Panamanian Academy of History, Association Argentina of International Law, Active 20-30 Club of Panama and the Kiwanis Club of Panama.

He died in New York City.

== Books ==
- The Civil Cassation in the Panamanian legislation (1968)
- International Law (1977)
- The Treaty concerning the permanent neutrality and operation of the Panama Canal (1983)
- Enrique Linares in the political history of Panama (1869–1949) - calvary of a people to consolidate their sovereignty (1989).
