= Tortolita Mountains =

Landform in Pinal and Pima Counties, Arizona

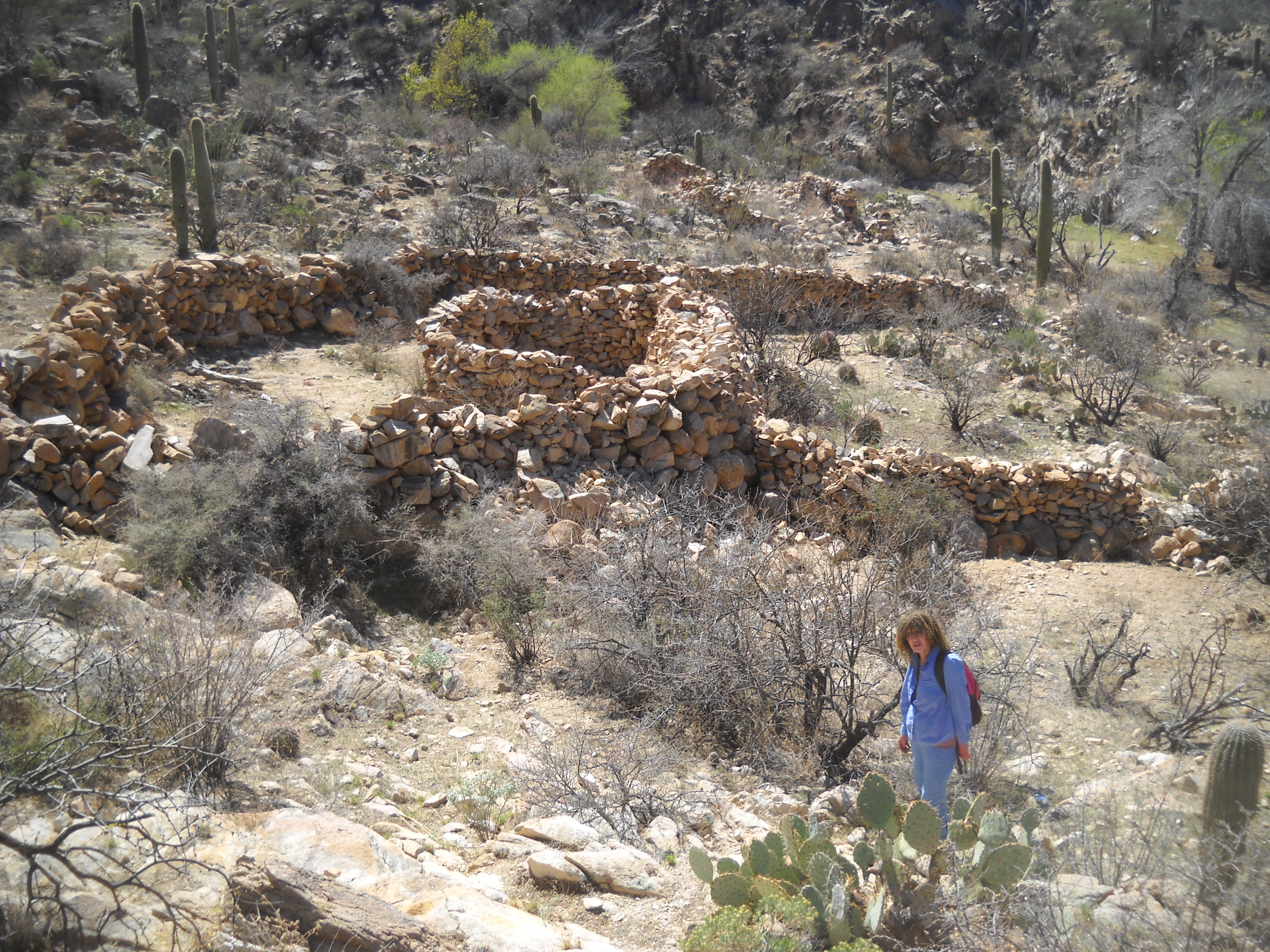
- Old stone sheep pens in Derrio Canyon, west end of Tortolitas

Highest point
- Elevation: 4,696 ft (1,431 m)
- Coordinates: 32°31.78′N 111°02.44′W

Geography
- Location within Arizona
- Country: United States
- State: Arizona
- Region: Sonoran Desert
- Counties: Pinal; Pima
- Settlement: Tucson

The Tortolita Mountains are a modest mountain range northwest of Tucson, Arizona, USA, at the northern boundaries of Oro Valley and Marana, two suburbs of Tucson. Peak elevation is 4,696 feet (1,431 m). Much of the mountain range is protected within the Tortolita Mountain Park, established in 1986 by Pima County, which plans to expand its territory.

The Tortolita Mountains include extensive cultural resources. The Native American people known as the Hohokam occupied this area for approximately 700 years beginning around AD 500. In the eastern foothills of the Tortolita Mountains are ruins of Honeybee Village, a former Hohokam village preserved and maintained by the Town of Oro Valley.

Nearby is Honeybee Canyon, a riparian area with one of Pima County's few perennial streams, Honeybee Creek. Residential and related development near this area has been a source of conflict between environmentalists and real estate developers, beginning in the 1990s. Resorts, golf courses, and upscale homes have been developed near the canyon, generating significant controversy because of their threat to its cultural and environmental resources.. Honeybee Canyon Park is a small developed area with restrooms, and is the trailhead for the popular Honeybee Canyon trail.

Other mountain ranges surrounding the Tucson Valley include the Santa Catalina Mountains (the area's most prominent), the Rincon Mountains, the Santa Rita Mountains, and the Tucson Mountains.
