= Ty Thompson =

American football player (born 2003)

No. 13 – Tulane Green Wave
- Position: Tight end
- Class: Redshirt Senior

Personal information
- Born: February 2, 2003 (age 23)
- Listed height: 6 ft 4 in (1.93 m)
- Listed weight: 235 lb (107 kg)

Career information
- High school: Mesquite (Gilbert, Arizona)
- College: Oregon (2021–2023); Tulane (2024–present)

Awards and highlights
- Ed Doherty Award (2020)
- Stats at ESPN

Ty Thompson (born February 2, 2003) is an American college football tight end for the Tulane Green Wave. He previously played for the Oregon Ducks as a quarterback.

== Early life ==
Thompson attended Mesquite High School in Gilbert, Arizona. As a senior in 2020, he passed for 3,431 yards and 34 touchdowns. He won numerous awards that season, including the All-American Bowl Offensive Player of the Year, Maxwell Football Club Offensive Player of the Year, Ed Doherty Award and was the Arizona Gatorade Football Player of the Year. For his high school career, Thompson passed for 9,891 yards with 100 touchdowns and rushed for 1,145 yards with 20 touchdowns. A five-star recruit by Rivals.com, Thompson committed to the University of Oregon to play college football. He was the highest rated quarterback recruit to sign with Oregon.

== College career ==
=== Oregon ===
Thompson competed with Anthony Brown for the starting job his true freshman year at Oregon in 2021. Brown won the job, with Thompson appearing in three games as a backup and taking a redshirt. For the season, he completed seven of 15 passes for 87 yards with a touchdown and two interceptions. In 2022 he competed with Bo Nix to be starter, with Nix winning the competition. He appeared in seven games as a backup, completing 11 of 20 passes for 72 yards with two interceptions. Thompson returned to Oregon as Nix' backup in 2023. He entered the transfer portal on December 11, 2023.

=== Tulane ===
On January 5, 2024, Thompson committed to play for Tulane. On January 7, 2025, after briefly entering the transfer portal, Thompson returned to Tulane and converted into a tight end.

=== Statistics ===
Year	Team	Games			Passing								Rushing			
Year	Team	GP	GS	Record	Comp	Att	Pct	Yards	Avg	TD	Int	Rate	Att	Yards	Avg	TD
2021	Oregon	3	0	0−0	7	15	46.7	87	5.8	2	1	126.1	3	10	3.3	0
2022	Oregon	7	0	0−0	11	20	55.0	72	3.6	0	2	65.2	4	-2	-0.5	0
2023	Oregon	7	0	0−0	24	31	77.4	297	9.6	4	1	194.0	8	48	6.0	0
2024	Tulane	12	1	0−1	17	40	42.5	199	5.0	3	3	94.0	49	260	5.3	6
Career		29	1	0−1	59	106	55.7	655	6.2	9	7	122.4	64	316	4.9	6
