= Jeff Cotton (American football) =

American gridiron football player (born 1997)

Profile
- Position: Wide receiver

Personal information
- Born: April 17, 1997 (age 29); Tucson, Arizona, U.S.
- Listed height: 6 ft 2 in (1.88 m)
- Listed weight: 206 lb (93 kg)

Career information
- High school: Mountain View (Tucson, Arizona)
- College: Idaho
- NFL draft: 2020: undrafted

Career history
- Los Angeles Chargers (2020)*; Jacksonville Jaguars (2021); Arizona Cardinals (2022)*; Green Bay Packers (2022–2023)*; BC Lions (2024)*
- * Offseason or practice squad member only

Career NFL statistics
- Games played: 1
- Stats at Pro Football Reference

Jeff Cotton Jr. (born April 17, 1997) is an American professional football wide receiver. He played college football at Idaho after playing for two years at Pima Community College.

== Professional career ==
=== Los Angeles Chargers ===
Cotton signed with the Los Angeles Chargers as an undrafted free agent on April 25, 2020. He was waived by the Chargers during final roster cuts on September 5, but was re–signed to the team's practice squad the next day.

=== Jacksonville Jaguars ===
Cotton was signed by the Jacksonville Jaguars on July 31, 2021. He was cut by the Jaguars at the end of training camp on August 31, and was re-signed back to the team's practice squad. Cotton was elevated to the active roster on January 2, 2022, for the team's Week 17 game against the New England Patriots, and made his NFL debut in the game. He signed a reserve/future contract with Jacksonville on January 10.

On August 30, 2022, Cotton was waived by the Jaguars as a part of final roster cuts.

=== Arizona Cardinals ===
On September 14, 2022, Cotton signed with the practice squad of the Arizona Cardinals. He was released by the Cardinals on September 20 following the signing of Devon Kennard.

=== Green Bay Packers ===
On November 9, 2022, Cotton was signed to the Green Bay Packers' practice squad. He signed a reserve/future contract with Green Bay on January 10, 2023. Cotton was waived/injured by the Packers on July 26.

=== BC Lions ===
On December 20, 2023, it was announced that Cotton had been signed by the BC Lions of the Canadian Football League. He was released by the Lions on June 2, 2024.
