= Marana Unified School District =

School district in Arizona, United States

Coordinates: 32.45316°N 111.2074°W

- 11279 W. Grier Road Marana AZ 85653 Pima County, Arizona

District information
- Type: Public
- Motto: Inspiring students to learn today & lead tomorrow.
- Superintendent: Dr. Dan Streeter
- Schools: 20

Other information
- Website: https://www.maranausd.org/

Marana Unified School District (MUSD) is a public school district located in Marana, AZ, comprising 20 schools in Pima County, Arizona. It has its headquarters in Marana. It has 12,293 students in grades PK, K-12 with a student-teacher ratio of 19 to 1, about 650 teachers. Founded in the early 1920s, MUSD's boundaries include 550 square miles (1,400 km^{2}) of land.

== Schools ==
The Marana Unified School District has a total of 20 schools:

- 1 preschool
- 10 elementary schools
- 3 K-8 schools
- 2 middle schools
- 4 high schools

== Preschools ==
1. Play & Learn Preschool (PAL)

== Elementary schools ==
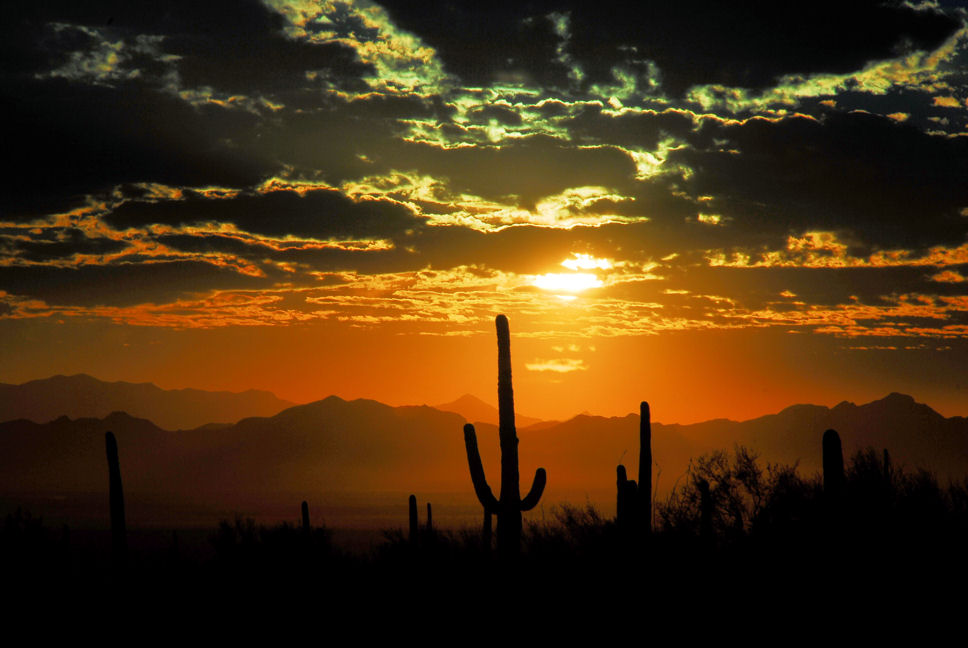
Marana, Arizona

In alphabetical order:

1. Butterfield Elementary (Casas Adobes Community Advocate, Casas Adobes)
2. Coyote Trail Elementary (Marana)
3. DeGrazia Elementary (Cortaro)
4. Estes Elementary (Marana)
5. Gladden Farms Elementary (Marana)
6. Ironwood Elementary (Casas Adobes Community Advocate, Casas Adobes)
7. Picture Rocks Elementary (Picture Rocks),
8. Quail Run Elementary (Casas Adobes Community Advocate, Cortaro)
9. Rattlesnake Ridge Elementary (Marana),
10. Roadrunner Elementary (Avra Valley),

== K-8 schools ==
In alphabetical order:

1. Dove Mountain (CSTEM)
2. Tangerine Farms K-8 (Marana)
3. Twin Peaks K-8 (Marana)

== Middle schools ==
In alphabetical order:

1. Marana Middle (Marana)
2. Tortolita Middle (Cortaro)

== High schools ==
In alphabetical order:

1. Marana High School (Marana)
2. Marana Vista Academy (Marana)
3. MCAT High School (Marana)
4. Mountain View High School (Cortaro)
