= Nordic Response =

NATO military exercises hosted by Norway

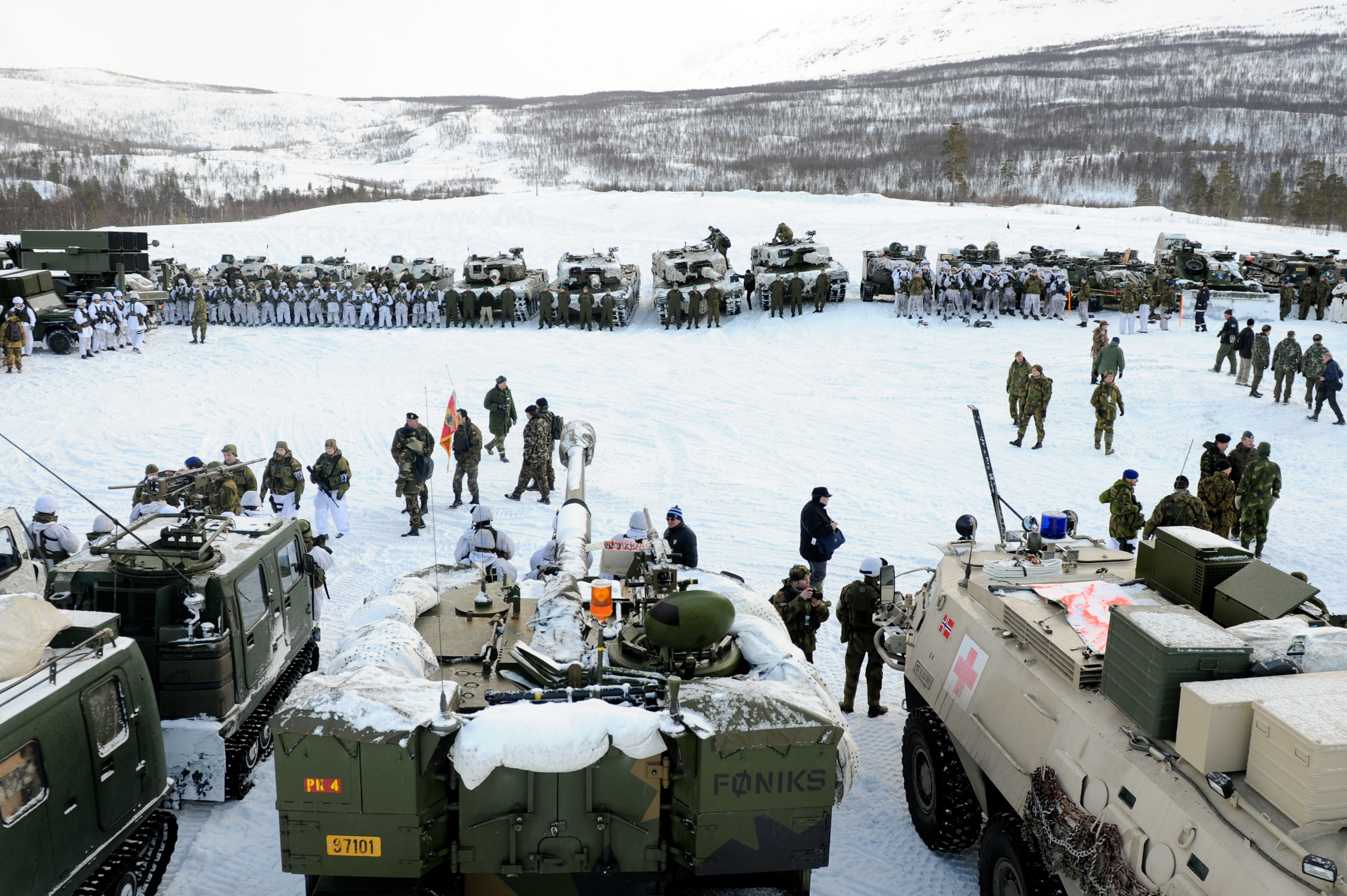
Norwegian military preparations during Exercise Cold Response, 2009

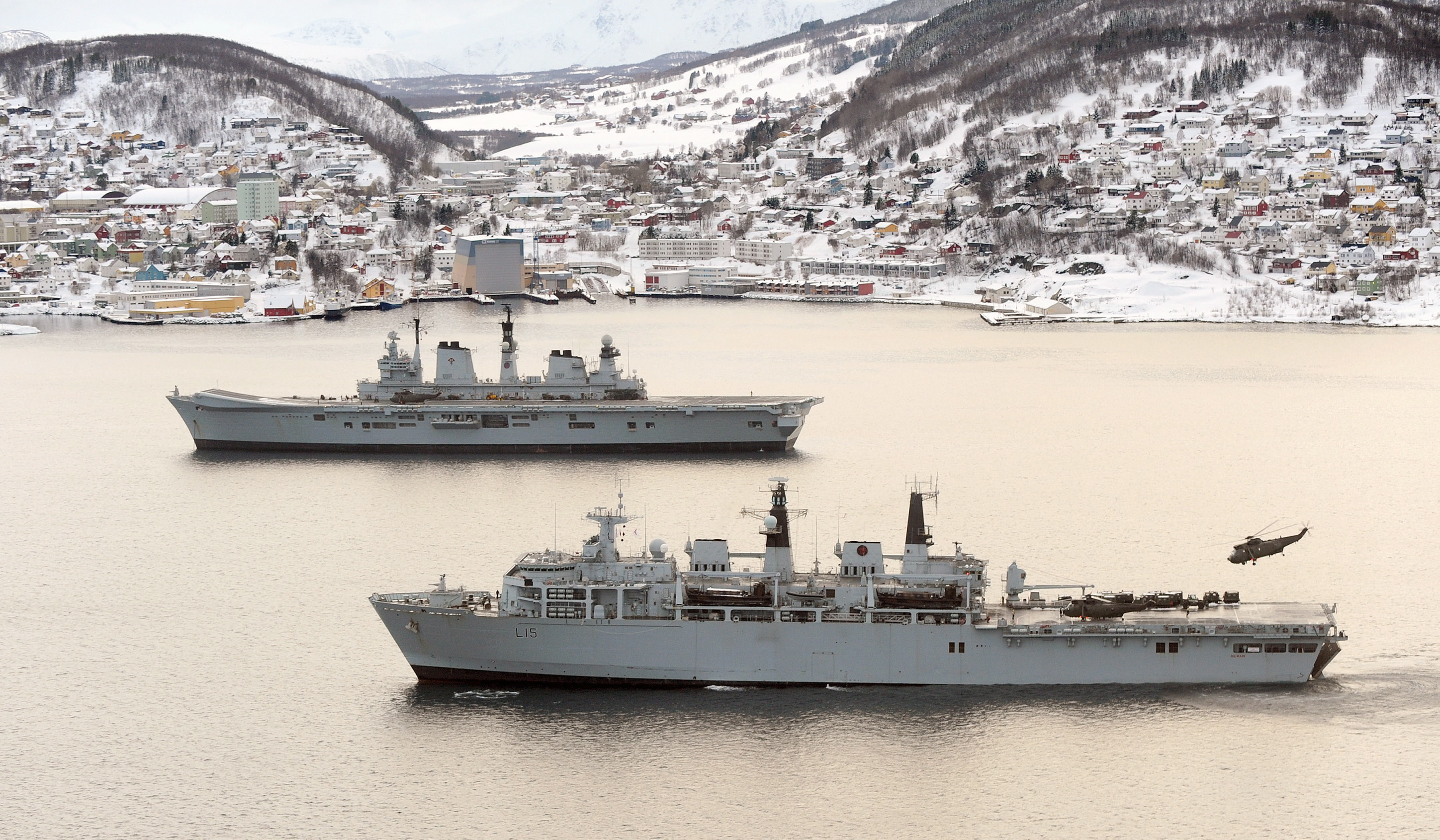
Royal Navy assault ships HMS Illustrious and HMS Bulwark during Exercise Cold Response, 2012

Nordic Response (named Cold Response until 2023) is a military exercise hosted by Norway with other NATO and invited Partnership for Peace countries held every other year.

== Exercises ==
=== The 2006 exercise ===
The first exercises was the largest military exercise in Norway in 2006. Around 10,000 soldiers from 11 nations participated.

==== Operations ====
Several of the operations were along the coast in the borders between sea and land, and together with roads and populated areas. Surveillance, patrols, road control posts, vehicle inspection, control of air space, minesweeping, evacuation of civilians, and riot control were important part of the exercise.

==== Participants ====
Among the participants were the Norwegian Telemark Battalion, a thousand soldiers from the Norwegian Home Guard, the Royal Norwegian Air Force's 339 Squadron and 720 Squadron, and most of the Royal Norwegian Navy's available forces. About 3,000 soldiers from the British 3 Commando Brigade, completed their annual winter training by taking part in the exercise. 800 French mountain special forces, and 2,000 Swedish soldiers along with smaller units from the Netherlands, Latvia, Estonia, Switzerland, United States, Finland, Spain, Denmark and Canada also took part.

==== Scenario ====
Following an earthquake in a fictional nation called Asando, an armed conflict by extremists and separation-groups against government forces erupts. The security council approves a resolution to allow NATO to take control of the situation. A peacekeeping force was assigned to help settle the conflict.

=== The 2009 exercise ===
The military exercises were held through 16-25 March.

=== The 2010 exercise ===
The military exercises were from 17 February - 4 March, with up to 9,000 troops from 14 participating nations.

=== The 2012 exercise ===
12–21 March, with over 16,000 troops from 15 participating nations.

=== The 2014 exercise ===
7–22 March, with over 16,000 troops from 16 participating nations.

=== The 2016 exercise ===
29 February through 11 March, with over 15,000 troops from 12 participating nations.

=== The 2020 exercise ===
2-18 March, with some 16,000 troops from 10 participation nations.

Stopped and canceled on 11 March due to the risk of increase spreading of COVID-19.

=== The 2021 exercise - cancelled before exercise ===
The exercise that was cancelled in January 2021 due to the COVID-19 pandemic.

=== The 2022 exercise ===
The exercise is scheduled for March and April 2022 and will be led by the Norwegian Joint Headquarters. The first allied troops arrived in Norway in the autumn and winter 2021–22 to train and prepare for the exercise.

The military activity took take place in south-eastern Norway, Central Norway and Northern Norway. As of March 2022, a total of 27 nations and approximately 30,000 troops are signed up for the exercise. According to a Norwegian Joint Headquarters spokesman, this is 5,000 fewer troops than expected due to the concurrent Russian invasion of Ukraine.

=== The 2024 exercise ===
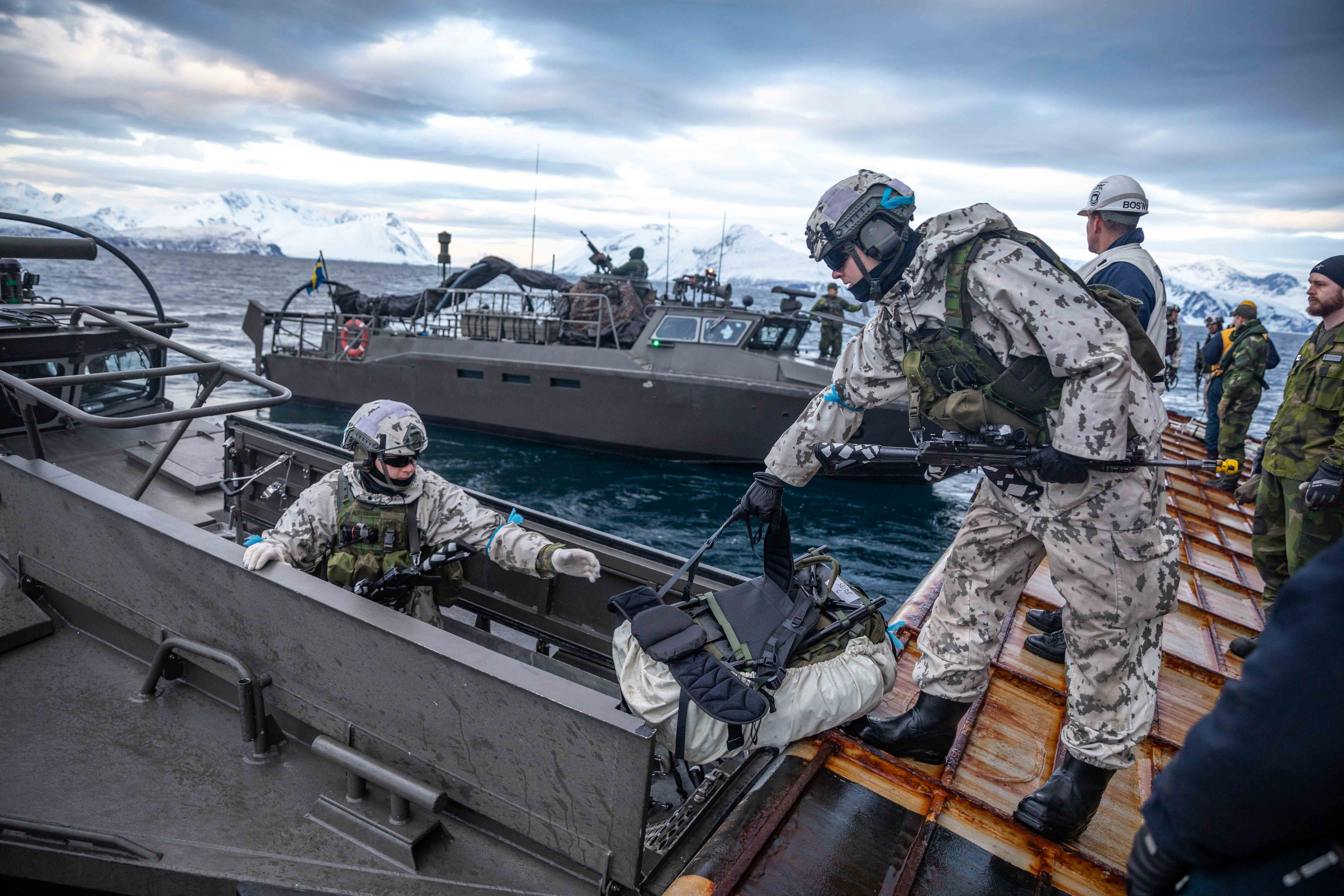
Finnish Coastal Jaegers load gear into a Swedish CB90-class (2024)

4—15 March

In 2024, the exercise was renamed Nordic Response, reflecting the NATO accession of Finland and Sweden.

NATO initiated the Nordic Response 2024 exercise with over 20,000 troops from 13 nations, including Finland, Norway and Sweden. The drill is conducted in Arctic conditions.

=== The 2026 exercise ===
The exercise was called Cold Response 26, involved 25,000 troops in Norway and 7,500 in Finland, totalling 32,500.

The United States cancelled some of its F-35 participation due to the 2026 Iran War. Sweden linked its participation in the exercise to the Swedish-led FLF Finland force. Yle cited concerns the exercise would cause damage to infrastructure, highlighting cracked roads in Enontekiö after the 2024 exercise. The Finnish Defence Forces promised to 'responsibly pay' compensation to fix such damage that could be caused by this exercise. On the other hand some business owners say they benefit from the soldiers through the extra business and customers because of the exercise.

== Accidents ==
=== Leopard 2 through the ice ===
Two Norwegian soldiers from the Telemark Battalion died when a Leopard 2 tank went through the ice in 2006.

=== C-130 Hercules accident ===
A Royal Norwegian Air Force C-130 Hercules crashed during the exercise in the north of Sweden on 15 March 2012 where all five on board were killed.

=== MV-22B Osprey accident ===
A United States Marine Corps MV-22B Osprey aircraft crashed in Beiarn Municipality during the exercise on 18 March 2022. All 4 crew members were killed.
