= Nicco Marchiol =

American football player (born 2003)

No. 4 – Northwestern Wildcats
- Position: Quarterback
- Class: (redshirt) Junior

Personal information
- Born: June 21, 2003 (age 23)
- Listed height: 6 ft 2 in (1.88 m)
- Listed weight: 235 lb (107 kg)

Career information
- High school: Hamilton (AZ) (Chandler, Arizona)
- College: West Virginia (2022–2025); Northwestern (2026–present)

Awards and highlights
- Ed Doherty Award (2021)
- Stats at ESPN

Nicco Marchiol (born June 21, 2003) is an American college football quarterback for the Northwestern Wildcats. He has previously played for the West Virginia Mountaineers.

== Early life ==
Marchiol was born into a football family; his father, Ken, having played linebacker for the New Orleans Saints and San Francisco 49ers. Growing up in Colorado, he began his football journey as a defensive end before transitioning to quarterback. He began playing high school football at Regis Jesuit High School in Aurora, Colorado. During his sophomore season, he led the Raiders to an 11-1 record and an appearance in the Colorado 5A quarterfinals. Prior to his junior season, Marchiol and his family relocated to Chandler, Arizona, where he enrolled at Hamilton High School. During his senior year he was awarded the Ed Doherty Award, Arizona Gatorade Player of the Year, MaxPreps Arizona Player of the Year, and the National Football Foundation's Frank Kush Award. Over the course of his high school career, Marchiol amassed 8,310 passing yards and 91 touchdowns across 43 games.

== College career ==
=== West Virginia ===
Marchiol redshirted his first year at West Virginia. He saw limited game action, completing 2 of 4 passes for 32 yards and a touchdown against Towson, and rushing for a season-best 32 yards at Oklahoma State. The following season, he appeared in nine games, starting one. In 2024, he played in eight games, completing 37 of 56 passes for 434 yards and five touchdowns. In a standout performance against Arizona, he completed 18 of 22 passes for 198 yards and two touchdowns, leading the Mountaineers to a 31–26 victory. On January 1, 2025, Marchiol announced he would return to West Virginia for his redshirt junior season. After sustaining a foot injury during the Mountaineer's Week 4 game against Kansas, Marchiol missed the rest of the season. On January 1, 2026, Marchiol announced he would enter the transfer portal.

=== Northwestern ===
On March 16, 2026, Marchiol transferred to play for the Northwestern Wildcats. At Northwestern, Marchiol competed for the starting quarterback role, but ultimately lost the position battle to Aidan Chiles. After Chiles sustained an upper body injury, Marchiol made his first start at for the Wildcats againts the visiting Iowa Hawkeyes on November 7.

=== College statistics ===
| Season | Team | Games | | | Passing | | | | | | | | Rushing | | | |
| Season | Team | GP | GS | Record | Cmp | Att | Pct | Yds | Avg | TD | Int | Rtg | Att | Yds | Avg | TD |
|---|---|---|---|---|---|---|---|---|---|---|---|---|---|---|---|---|
| 2022 | West Virginia | 2 | 0 | — | 4 | 13 | 30.8 | 61 | 4.7 | 1 | 0 | 95.6 | 6 | 32 | 5.3 | 0 |
| 2023 | West Virginia | 9 | 1 | 1–0 | 30 | 53 | 56.6 | 247 | 4.7 | 2 | 3 | 96.9 | 38 | 133 | 3.5 | 1 |
| 2024 | West Virginia | 8 | 2 | 2–0 | 37 | 56 | 66.1 | 434 | 7.8 | 5 | 2 | 153.5 | 40 | 120 | 3.0 | 2 |
| 2025 | West Virginia | 4 | 4 | 2–2 | 66 | 98 | 67.3 | 720 | 7.3 | 2 | 2 | 131.7 | 40 | 56 | 1.4 | 1 |
| 2026 | Northwestern | 6 | 2 | 0–2 | 42 | 64 | 65.6 | 406 | 6.3 | 2 | 0 | 129.2 | 35 | 59 | 1.7 | 1 |
| Career | | 29 | 9 | 5–4 | 179 | 284 | 63.0 | 1,868 | 6.6 | 12 | 7 | 127.3 | 159 | 400 | 2.5 | 5 |

== Personal life ==
Marchiol is the son of Ken and Suzi Marchiol and has two older brothers, Angelo and Santino. Santino was a linebacker for Texas A&M.
