= Accidents and incidents involving the V-22 Osprey =

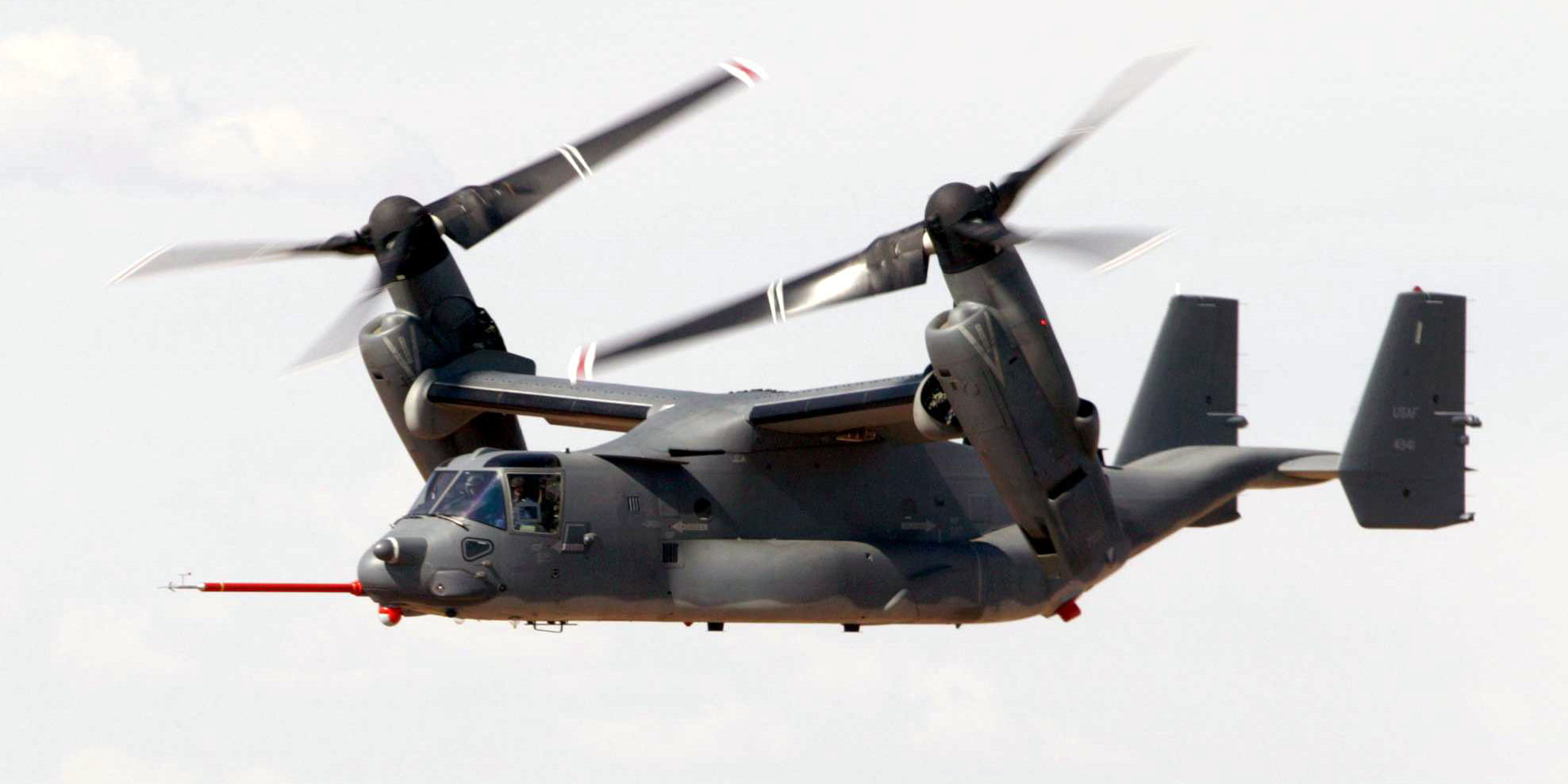
A U.S. Air Force CV-22 Osprey switches between flight modes during a test mission.

The Bell Boeing V-22 Osprey is an American military tiltrotor aircraft whose history of accidents has provoked concerns about its safety. The aircraft was developed by Bell Helicopter and Boeing Helicopters, which build and support the aircraft.

As of November 2023, sixteen V-22 Ospreys have been damaged beyond repair in incidents that have killed a total of sixty-two people. Four of the crashes occurred during developmental flight tests; these killed a total of thirty people from 1991 to 2000. Since the V-22 became operational in 2007, twelve crashes and several other incidents have killed a total of thirty-two people.

Most of the crashes have involved the most numerous of the aircraft's three variants: the MV-22B, procured and flown by the U.S. Marine Corps. A handful of crashes have involved CV-22Bs, flown by U.S. Air Force Special Operations Command. No crashes have involved the CMV-22B, the carrier onboard delivery variant flown by the U.S. Navy.

== Crashes and hull–loss accidents ==
=== June 1991 ===
On 11 June 1991, a miswired flight control system led to two minor injuries when the left nacelle struck the ground while the aircraft was hovering 15 feet (4.6 m) in the air, causing it to bounce and catch fire at the New Castle County Airport in Delaware. The pilot, Grady Wilson, suspected that he may have accidentally set the throttle lever the opposite direction to that intended, exacerbating the crash if not causing it.

=== July 1992 ===
On 20 July 1992, pre-production V-22 #4's right engine failed and caused the aircraft to drop into the Potomac River by Marine Corps Base Quantico with an audience of Department of Defense and industry officials watching. Flammable liquids collected in the right nacelle and led to an engine fire and subsequent failure. All seven on board were killed and the V-22 fleet was grounded for eleven months following the accident. A titanium firewall now protects the composite propshaft.

=== April 2000 ===
A V-22 loaded with Marines, to simulate a rescue, attempted to land at Marana Northwest Regional Airport in Arizona on 8 April 2000. It descended faster than normal (over 2,000 ft/min or 10 m/s) from an unusually high altitude with a forward speed of under 45 miles per hour (39 kn; 72 km/h) when it suddenly stalled its right rotor at 245 feet (75 m), rolled over, crashed, and exploded, killing all nineteen on board.

The cause was determined to be vortex ring state (VRS), a fundamental limitation on vertical descent that is common to helicopters. At the time of the mishap, the V-22's flight operations rules restricted the Osprey to a descent rate of 800 feet per minute (4.1 m/s) at airspeeds below 40 knots (74 km/h) (restrictions typical of helicopters); the crew of the accident aircraft had descended at over twice this rate. Another factor that may have triggered VRS was the operation of multiple aircraft in close proximity, also believed to be a risk factor for VRS in helicopters.

Subsequent testing showed that the V-22 and other tiltrotors are generally less susceptible to VRS than helicopters; VRS entry is more easily recognized, recovery is more intuitive for the pilot, altitude loss is significantly less, and, with sufficient altitude (2,000 ft or 610 m or more), VRS recovery is relatively easy. The V-22 has a safe descent envelope as large as or larger than most helicopters, further enhancing its ability to enter and depart hostile landing zones quickly and safely. The project team also dealt with the problem by adding a simultaneous warning light and voice that says "Sink Rate" when the V-22 approaches half of the VRS-vulnerable descent rate.

=== December 2000 ===
On 11 December 2000, a V-22 had a flight control error and crashed near Jacksonville, North Carolina at Marine Corps Air Station New River, killing all four aboard. Vibration-induced chafing from an adjacent wiring bundle caused a leak in the hydraulic line, which fed the primary side of the swashplate actuators to the right side rotor blade controls. The leak caused a Primary Flight Control System (PFCS) alert. A previously undiscovered error in the aircraft's control software caused it to decelerate in response to each of the pilot's eight attempts to reset the software as a result of the PFCS alert. The uncontrollable aircraft fell 1,600 feet (490 m) and crashed in a forest. The wiring harnesses and hydraulic line routing in the nacelles were subsequently modified. This caused the Marine Corps to ground its fleet of eight V-22s, the second grounding in 2000.

=== March 2006 ===
A MV-22B experienced an uncommanded engine acceleration while turning on the ground at Marine Corps Air Station New River, NC. Since the aircraft regulates power turbine speed with blade pitch, the reaction caused the aircraft to go airborne with the Torque Control Lever (TCL, or throttle) at idle. The aircraft rose 6 to 7 feet (1.8 to 2.1 m) into the air (initial estimates suggested twenty to thirty feet) and then fell to the ground, causing damage to its starboard wing; the damage was valued at approximately US$7 million. It was later found that a miswired cannon plug to one of the engine's two Full Authority Digital Engine Controls (FADEC) was the cause. The FADEC software was also modified to decrease the time needed for switching between the redundant FADECs to eliminate the possibility of a similar mishap occurring in the future. The aircraft was found to be damaged beyond repair and stricken from Navy's list in July 2009.

=== April 2010 ===
In April 2010, a CV-22 crashed near the city of Qalat in Zabul Province, Afghanistan. Three US service members and one civilian were killed and sixteen were injured in the crash. Initially, it was unclear if the accident was caused by enemy fire. The loaded CV-22B was at its hovering capability limit, landing at night near Qalat (altitude approx. 5,000 feet) in brownout conditions, in turbulence due to the location in a gully. The USAF investigation ruled out brownout conditions, enemy fire, and vortex ring state as causes. The investigation found several factors that significantly contributed to the crash: These include low visibility, a poorly executed approach, loss of situational awareness, and a high descent rate.

Brig. Gen. Donald Harvel, board president of the first investigation into the crash, fingered the "unidentified contrails" during the last seventeen seconds of flight as indications of engine troubles. Harvel has become a critic of the aircraft since his retirement and states that his retirement was placed on hold for two years to silence him from speaking publicly about his concerns about the aircraft's safety. The actual causes of the crash may never be known because US military aircraft destroyed the wreckage and black-box recorder. Former USAF chief V-22 systems engineer Eric Braganca stated that the V-22's engines normally emit puffs of smoke and the data recorders showed that the engines were operating normally at that time.

=== April 2012 ===
An MV-22B belonging to the 2nd Marine Aircraft Wing, VMM-261, was participating in Exercise African Lion when it crashed near Tan-Tan and Agadir, Morocco, on 11 April 2012, killing two Marines. Two others were seriously injured, and the aircraft was lost. U.S. investigators found no mechanical flaw with the aircraft, and human error was determined to be the cause.

=== June 2012 ===
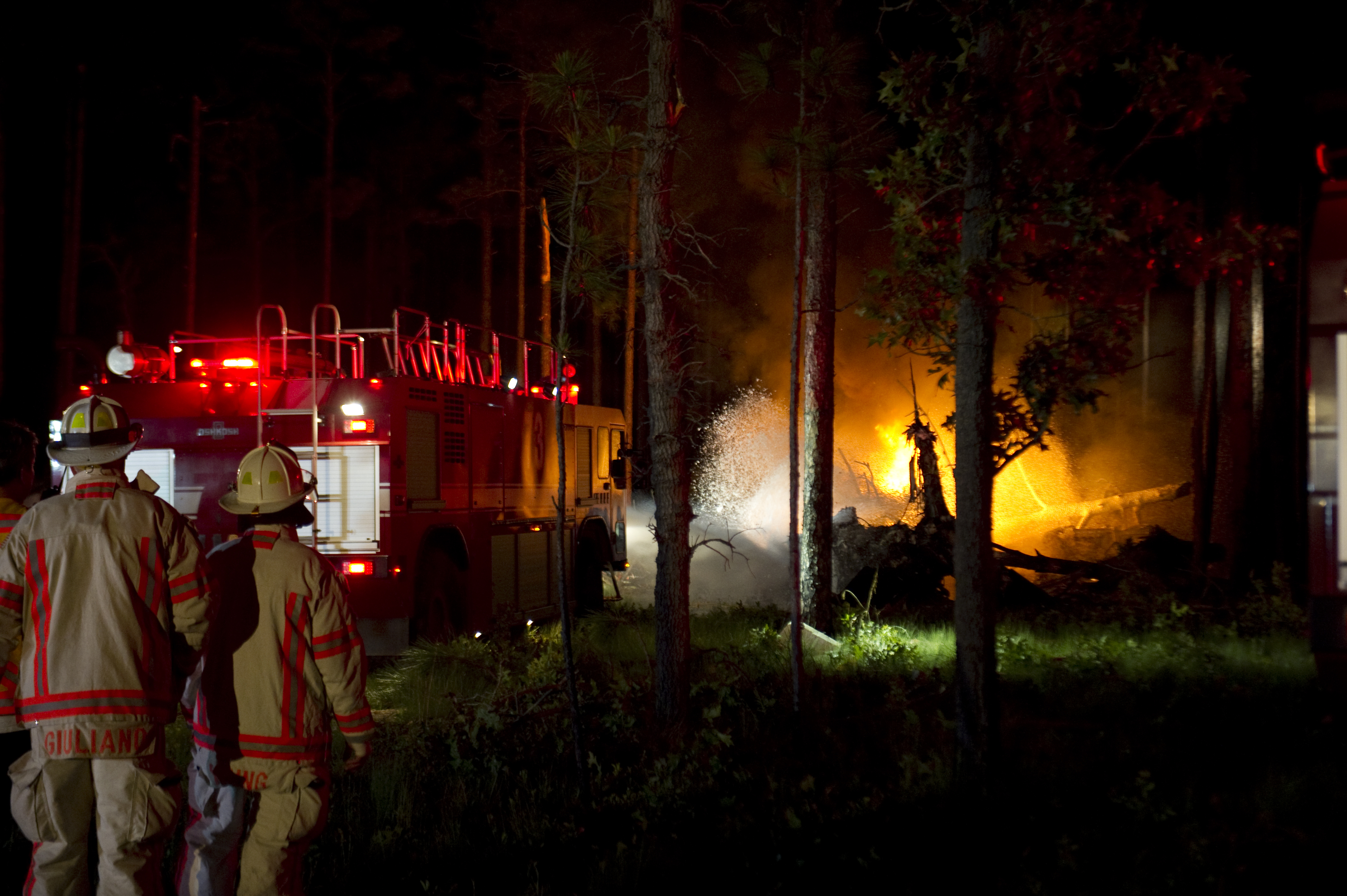
Eglin Air Force Base firefighters respond to the June 2012 CV-22B crash.

On 13 June 2012, a USAF CV-22B crashed at Eglin Air Force Base in Florida during training. All five aboard were injured; two were released from the hospital shortly after. The aircraft came to rest upside down and received major damage. The cause of the crash was determined to be pilot error, with the CV-22 flying through the proprotor wash of another aircraft. The USAF restarted formation flight training in response.

=== May 2015 ===
An MV-22B Osprey participating in a training exercise at Bellows Air Force Station, Oahu, Hawaii, sustained a hard landing that killed two Marines and injured twenty. The aircraft sustained fuselage damage and a fire onboard. The aircraft was determined to have suffered dust intake to the right engine, leading the Marine Corps to recommend improved air filters, and reduced allowed hover time in dust from sixty to thirty seconds.

=== December 2016 ===
On 13 December 2016 at 10:00 p.m., an MV-22B crashed while landing onto a reef in shallow water 0.6 miles (0.97 km) off the Okinawa coastline of Camp Schwab where the aircraft broke apart. All five crew members aboard with Marine Aircraft Group 36, 1st Marine Aircraft Wing were rescued. Two crew members were injured, and all were transported for treatment. Ospreys in Japan were grounded the following day. An investigation into the mishap was launched. Preliminary reports indicated that, during in-flight refueling with a MC-130, the refueling hose was struck by the Osprey's rotor blades. On 18 December 2016, after a review of MV-22B safety procedures, the III Marine Expeditionary Force (IIIMEF) announced that it would resume flight operations, concluding that they were confident that the mishap was due "solely to the aircraft's rotor blades coming into contact with the refueling line."

=== August 2017 ===
Video of the August 2017 crash from aboard USS Green Bay

An MV-22B Osprey assigned to the 31st Marine Expeditionary Unit, VMM-265, crashed in Shoalwater Bay, Australia on 5 August 2017, killing three Marines. The tiltrotor struck USS Green Bay and crashed into the sea shortly after taking off from amphibious assault ship USS Bonhomme Richard. Twenty-three personnel were recovered from the stricken aircraft, along with the three confirmed dead.

=== September 2017 ===
An MV-22B Osprey operating in Syria as part of Operation Inherent Resolve was damaged beyond repair in a hard landing on 28 September 2017. Two people on board the aircraft were injured. The non–salvageable Osprey burned shortly after the crash.

=== March 2022 ===
An MV-22B Osprey belonging to the 2nd Marine Aircraft Wing, VMM-261, while participating in NATO exercise Cold Response, crashed in Gråtådalen, a valley in Beiarn Municipality, Norway on 18 March 2022, killing all four Marines onboard. The crew were confirmed dead shortly after Norwegian authorities discovered the crash site. Investigators concluded that the causal factor of the crash was pilot error due to low altitude steep bank angle maneuvers exceeding the aircraft's normal operating envelope. Investigators noted that an unauthorized personal GoPro video camera was found at the crash site and was in use at the time of the crash. "Such devices are prohibited on grounds that they can incentivize risktaking and serve as a distraction; that may have been the case with Ghost 31," the report reads.

=== June 2022 ===
An MV-22B Osprey belonging to the 3rd Marine Aircraft Wing crashed near Glamis, California, on 8 June 2022, killing all five Marines onboard. Among the fatalities was Captain John J. Sax, son of the former Major League Baseball player and LA Dodger Steve Sax. The accident investigation determined that the crash was caused by a dual hard clutch engagement, which caused catastrophic malfunction of the aircraft's gearbox that led to drive system failures. From 2010 to the time of the crash, there had been sixteen similar clutch issues on Marine Ospreys. Initial reports erroneously claimed that nuclear material were onboard the aircraft at the time of the crash.

=== August 2023 ===
An MV-22B Osprey belonging to the 1st Marine Aircraft Wing, VMM-363 crashed on Melville Island, Australia on 27 August 2023, killing three Marines. The accident occurred while the aircraft was participating in "Predators Run 2023", a joint military exercise involving 2,500 personnel from Australia, the United States, Indonesia, the Philippines, and East Timor. The aircraft was carrying twenty-three U.S. Marines, of whom three were killed at the crash scene on the large island in the Timor Sea, 60 km north of Darwin, while another five were flown to a hospital in critical condition.

=== November 2023 ===
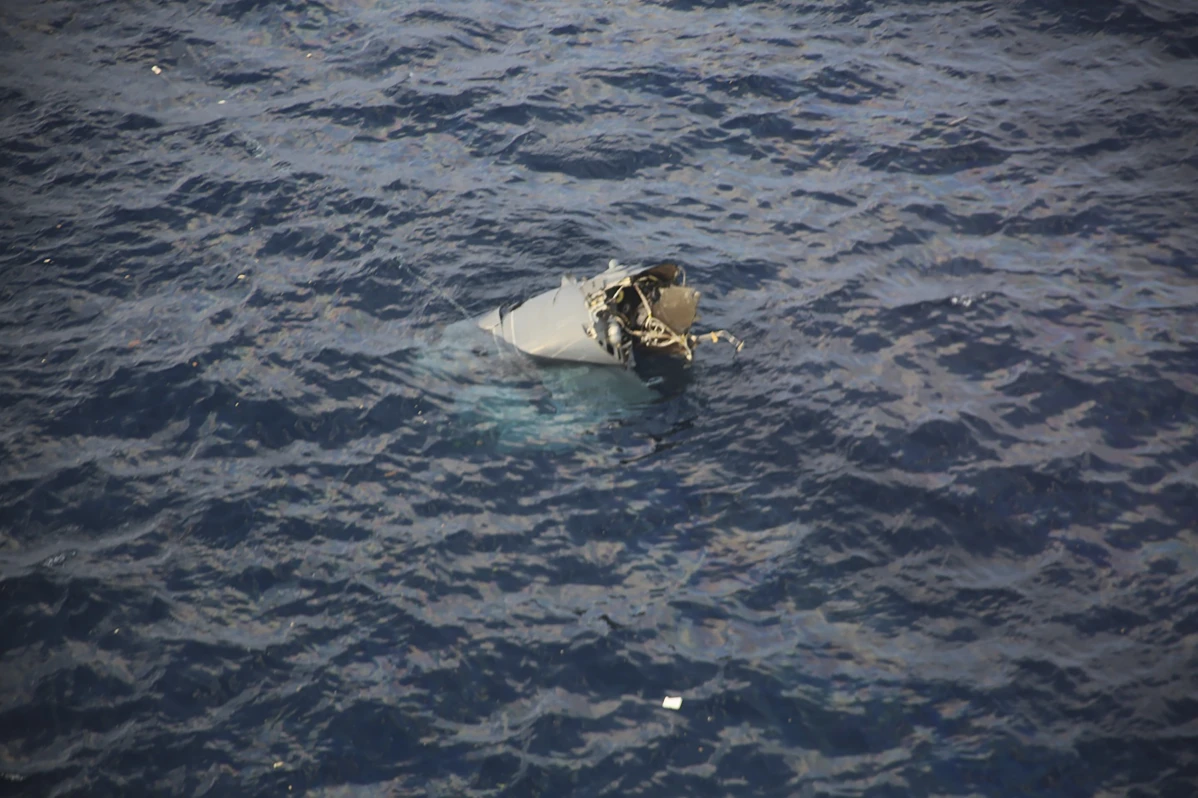
CV-22B wreckage in the East China Sea following the November 2023 crash

A CV-22B Osprey assigned to the US Air Force's 353rd Special Operations Wing crashed into the East China Sea about one kilometer (0.6 miles) off Yakushima Island, Japan, on 29 November 2023, killing all eight airmen aboard. The Osprey, based at Yokota Air Base in Western Tokyo, was flying from Marine Corps Air Station Iwakuni in Yamaguchi Prefecture to Kadena Air Base on Okinawa in clear weather and light winds. Witnesses reported seeing the aircraft flying inverted with flames engulfing the aircraft's left nacelle before an explosion occurred and the aircraft subsequently crashed in waters east of the island near Yakushima Airport. Japan grounded its fleet of fourteen Ospreys after the crash. The US Air Force grounded all of its CV-22 Ospreys one week later. The US Navy and Marines grounded their fleets of V-22 Ospreys pending the outcome of the CV-22 investigation.

On 3 January 2024 it was announced that the Flight Data and Cockpit Voice Recorders had been located and would be transported to laboratories for data retrieval, a process that would take several weeks. Seven of the eight remains of the airmen had been recovered and publicly identified, but search efforts were still underway for the remains of the eighth.

In early March 2024, the United States and Japan resumed flights of the V-22 with revised maintenance and pilot training focuses but no changes to the aircraft. The V-22 was returned to flight without equipment modifications, but investigators identified the part that failed and its failure mode. The accident remains under investigation.

== Other accidents and notable incidents ==
=== July 2006 ===
A V-22 experienced compressor stalls in its right engine in the middle of its first transatlantic flight to the United Kingdom for the Royal International Air Tattoo and Farnborough Airshow on 11 July 2006. It had to be diverted to Iceland for maintenance. A week later it was announced that other V-22s had been suffering from compressor surges and stalls, and the Navy launched an investigation into the issue.

=== December 2006 ===
It was reported that a serious nacelle fire occurred on a Marine MV-22 at New River in December 2006.

=== March 2007 ===
A V-22 experienced a hydraulic leak that led to an engine-compartment fire before takeoff on 29 March 2007.

=== November 2007 ===
An MV-22 Osprey of VMMT-204 caught on fire during a training mission and was forced to make an emergency landing at Camp Lejeune on 6 November 2007. The fire, which started in one of the engine nacelles, caused significant aircraft damage but no injuries.

After an investigation, it was determined that a design flaw with the engine air particle separator (EAPS) caused it to jam in flight, causing a shock wave in the hydraulics system and subsequent leaks. Hydraulic fluid leaked into the IR suppressors and was the cause of the nacelle fires. As a result, all Block A V-22 aircraft were placed under flight restrictions until modification kits could be installed. No fielded Marine MV-22s were affected, as those Block B aircraft already incorporated the modification.

=== 2009 ===
An Air Force CV-22 suffered a Class A mishap with more than $1 million in damage during FY 2009. No details were released.

=== July 2011 ===
On 7 July 2011, an MV-22 crew chief from VMM-264 squadron fell nearly 200 feet (61 m) to his death in southwestern Afghanistan.

=== October 2014 ===
In early October 2014, an MV-22 Osprey lost power shortly after takeoff from USS Makin Island. The aircraft splashed down in the Arabian Sea and was briefly partially submerged four feet (one metre) before the pilots regained control and landed on the carrier deck. One marine drowned after his life preserver failed to inflate when he bailed out of the aircraft. The accident was attributed to the aircraft being accidentally started in maintenance mode, which reduces engine power by a fifth.

=== January 2017 ===
On 29 January 2017, an MV-22 experienced a hard landing during the Yakla raid in Al Bayda, Yemen against Al-Qaeda in the Arabian Peninsula militants, causing two injuries to U.S. troops. The aircraft could not fly afterward and was destroyed by U.S. airstrikes.

=== April 2021 ===
In April 2021, a CV-22 Osprey destroyed the helipad at Addenbrooke's hospital in Cambridge, United Kingdom. The incident occurred as the USAF were conducting a medical transfer training mission.

== See also ==
- Boeing manufacturing and design issues
- Universal Stainless
- Headquarters Marine Corps Frequently Requested Records
