= Vortex ring state =

Aerodynamic condition related to helicopter flight

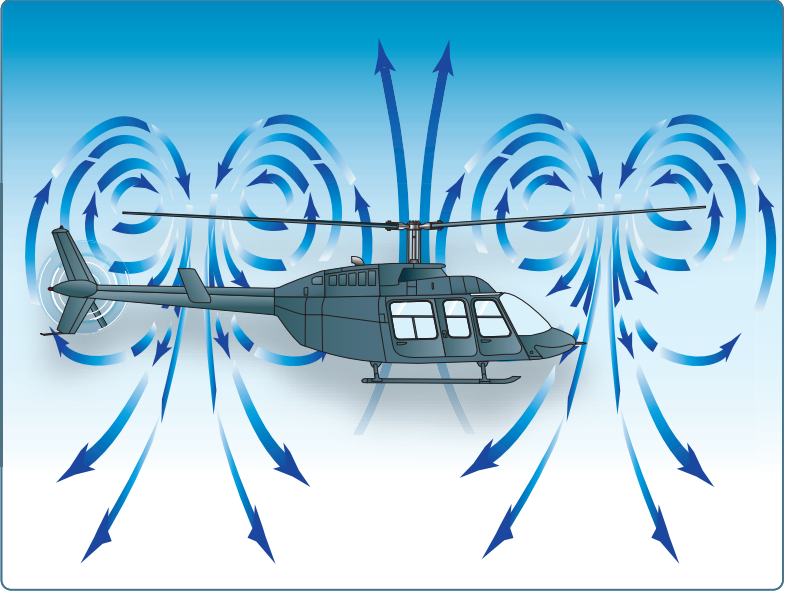
Vortex ring state, in which airflow is upward on the inner blade section, producing a secondary vortex in addition to the normal wingtip vortices. Turbulent airflow results in loss of rotor efficiency. If allowed to continue, uncommanded pitch-and-roll oscillations may occur, with a large descent rate.

The vortex ring state (VRS) is a dangerous aerodynamic condition that may arise in helicopter flight, when a vortex ring system engulfs the rotor, causing severe loss of lift. Often the term settling with power is used as a synonym, e.g., in Australia, the UK, and the US, but not in Canada, which uses the latter term for a different phenomenon.

A vortex ring state sets in when the airflow around a helicopter's main rotor assumes a rotationally symmetrical form over the tips of the blades, supported by a laminar flow over the blade tips, and a countering upflow of air outside and away from the rotor. In this condition, the rotor falls into a new topological state of the surrounding flow field, induced by its own downwash, and suddenly loses lift. Since vortex rings are a surprisingly stable fluid dynamical phenomenon (a form of topological soliton), the best way to recover from them is to laterally steer clear of them, in order to re-establish lift, and to break them up using maximum engine power, in order to establish turbulence.

This is also why the condition is often mistaken for "settling with insufficient power": high-powered maneuvers can both induce a vortex ring state in free air, and then at low altitude, during landing conditions, possibly break it. If sufficient power is not available to maintain the airfoil of the rotor at a stalled condition, while generating sufficient lift, the aircraft will not be able to stay aloft before the vortex ring state dissipates, and will crash.

This condition also occurs with tiltrotors, and it was responsible for an accident involving a V-22 Osprey in 2000. Vortex ring state caused the loss of a heavily modified MH-60 helicopter during Operation Neptune Spear, the 2011 raid in which Osama bin Laden was killed.

== Description ==
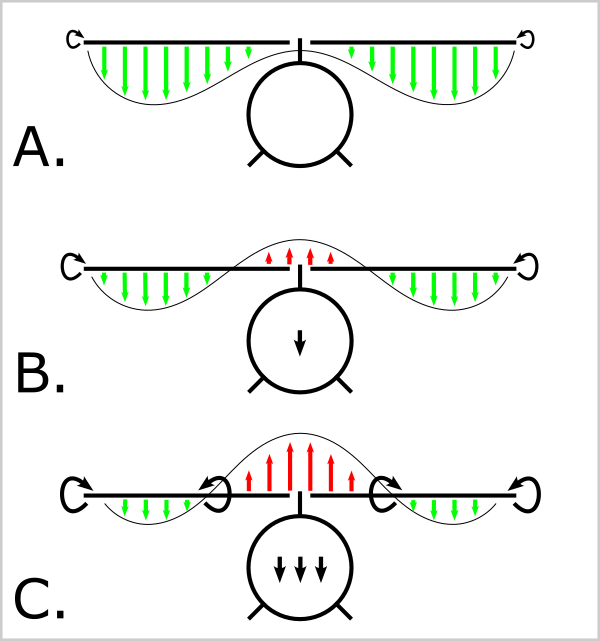
Airflow around the rotor blades during (A.) normal flight, (B.) rapid descent, and (C.) vortex ring state

Because the blades are rotating about a central axis, the speed of each airfoil is lowest at the point where it connects to the hub-and-grip assembly. This fundamental physical reality means that the innermost portion of each blade has an inherent vulnerability to stalling.

In forward flight with translational lift, there is no upward flow (upflow) of air in the hub area. As forward airspeed decreases and vertical descent rates increase, an upflow begins simply because there are no airfoil surfaces in the area of the hub, mast and blade-grip assembly.

Then, as the volume of upflow increases in the central region (i.e. between the hub and the innermost edges of the airfoils), the induced flow (air pulled or "induced" downwards through the rotor system) of the inner blade sections is overcome. This causes the innermost portions of the blades to begin to stall.

As the inner blade sections stall, a second set of vortices, similar to the rotor-tip vortices, begins to form in and around the center of the rotor system. This, combined with the outer set of vortices, results in severe loss of lift. The failure of a helicopter pilot to recognize and react to the condition can lead to high descent rates and catastrophic ground impact.

=== Occurrence ===
A helicopter normally encounters this condition when attempting to hover out-of-ground-effect (OGE) without maintaining precise altitude control; and while making downwind or steep, powered approaches when the airspeed is below Effective Translational Lift (ETL).

=== Detection and correction ===
The signs of VRS are a vibration in the main rotor system followed by an increasing sink rate and possibly a decrease of cyclic authority.

In single rotor helicopters, the vortex ring state is traditionally corrected by slightly lowering the collective to regain cyclic authority and using the cyclic control to apply lateral motion, often pitching the nose down to establish forward flight. In tandem-rotor helicopters, recovery is accomplished through lateral cyclic or pedal input or both. The aircraft will fly out of the vortex ring into "clean air", and will be able to regain lift.

An alternative, the Vuichard Recovery Technique, reduces altitude loss and recovers more quickly. Developed by Claude Vuichard, a Federal Office of Civil Aviation inspector in Switzerland, this recently popular technique uses thrust from the unaffected tail rotor to sideslip (move sideways without rotating) the helicopter by at least one rotor diameter. It can be thought of as maximizing sideways thrust from the tail rotor and balancing with the cyclic and collective to avoid rotation, but because the main rotor responds more slowly to the controls, it is actually performed in the opposite order: increase the collective to climb power, and apply cyclic in the direction of tail rotor thrust (as if turning opposite main rotor rotation) to a 15–20° bank angle, all while using the pedals to maintain heading (cross controls). Recovery is complete when the rotor disc reaches the upwind part of the vortex.

=== Powering out of vortex ring state ===
It is possible to power out of vortex ring state, but this requires having about twice the power it takes to hover. Only one full-scale helicopter, the Sikorsky S-64 Skycrane, is documented as being able to do this, when unladen.

== Pilot or operator reaction ==
Helicopter pilots are most commonly taught to avoid VRS by monitoring their rates of descent at lower airspeeds. When encountering VRS, pilots are taught to apply forward cyclic to fly out of the condition and/or lowering collective pitch. While transitioning to forward or lateral flight will alleviate the condition by itself, lowering the collective to reduce the power demand decreases the size of the vortices and reduces the amount of time required to be free of the condition. However, since the condition often occurs near the ground, lowering the collective may not be an option; a loss of altitude will occur proportional to the rate of descent developed before beginning the recovery. In some cases, vortex ring state is encountered and allowed to advance to the point that the pilot may severely lose cyclic authority due to the disrupted airflow. In these cases, the pilot's only recourse may be to enter an autorotation to break the rotor system free of its vortex ring state.

=== Tandem rotor helicopters ===
In a tandem rotor helicopter, forward cyclic will not arrest the rate of descent caused by VRS. In such a helicopter, which utilizes differential collective pitch in order to gain airspeed, lateral cyclic inputs must be made accompanied by pedal inputs in order to slide horizontally out of the vortex ring state's disturbed air.

=== Radio control multirotors ===
Radio controlled multirotors (common on drones) are subject to normal rotorcraft aerodynamics, including vortex ring state. Frame design, size and power affect the likelihood of entering the state and recovering from it. Multirotors that do not have altitude hold are also more likely to succumb to operator error, where the pilot drops the craft too fast resulting in the upwash at the rotor hubs that can lead to vortex ring state. Those that are equipped with that feature, on the other hand, tend to control their descent automatically and can usually (but not always) escape the dangerous condition.

== See also ==
- Aerospace engineering – Branch of engineering
- Ground effect (aerodynamics) – Increased aircraft lift generated when close to fixed surface
- Helicopter flight controls – Instruments used in helicopter flight
