= Marana Regional Airport =

Airport in Pima County, Arizona, United States

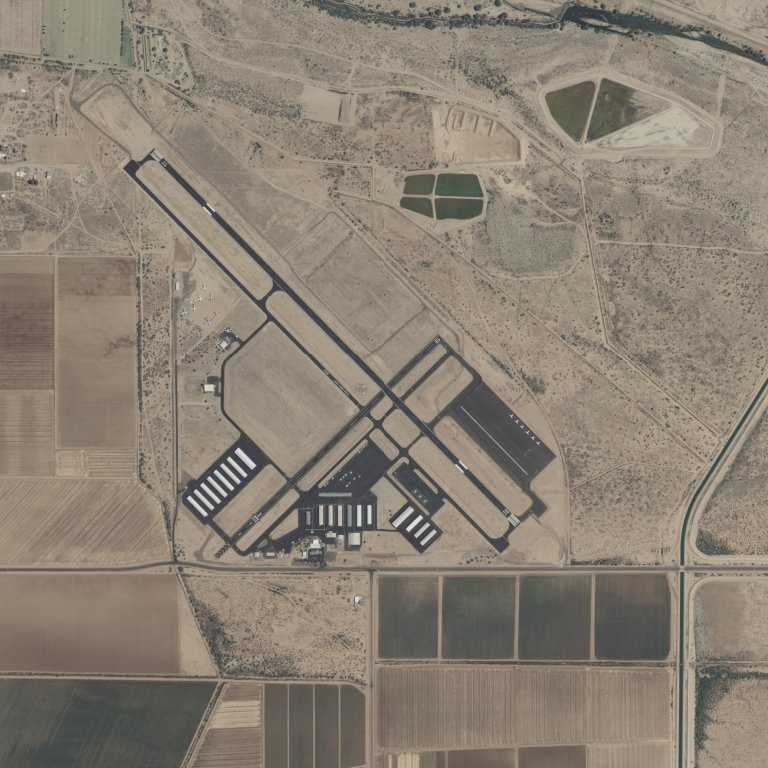
- IATA: AVW; ICAO: KAVQ; FAA LID: AVQ

Summary
- Airport type: Public
- Owner/Operator: Town of Marana
- Serves: Tucson, Arizona
- Location: Marana, Arizona
- Built: 1943; 83 years ago
- Elevation AMSL: 2,031 ft (619 m)
- Coordinates: 32°24′34.40″N 111°13′06.20″W
- Website: www.maranaaz.gov/airport

Map
- Location of airport in Arizona

Runways
Direction	Length		Surface
Direction	ft	m	Surface
3/21	3,892	1,186	Asphalt
12/30	6,901	2,103	Asphalt

Statistics (2023)
- Aircraft operations (year ending 4/15/2023): 90,252
- Based aircraft: 193
- Source: Federal Aviation Administration

Marana Regional Airport (IATA: AVW, ICAO: KAVQ, FAA LID: AVQ), also known as Marana Northwest Regional Airport or Avra Valley Airport, is a non-towered, general aviation airport about 15 mi (13 nmi; 24 km) northwest of Tucson in Marana, a town in Pima County, Arizona, United States. In 1999, the airport was purchased from Pima County by the town of Marana.

According to the FAA's National Plan of Integrated Airport Systems for 2007–2011, it is categorized as a relief airport. It is not served by any commercial airlines at this time.

Although most U.S. airports use the same three-letter location identifier for the FAA and IATA, Marana Regional Airport is assigned AVQ by the FAA and AVW by the IATA.

== Facilities ==
Marana Regional Airport covers 630 acres (250 ha) at an elevation of 2,031 ft (619 m) above mean sea level. AVQ has two asphalt paved runways:

- 12/30 measuring 6,901 ft × 100 ft (2,103 m × 30 m)
- 3/21 measuring 3,892 ft × 75 ft (1,186 m × 23 m)

For the 12-month period ending April 15, 2023, the airport had 90,252 aircraft operations, an average of 247 per day: 66% general aviation, 11% air taxi, and 22% military. At that time there were 193 aircraft based at this airport: 165 single-engine, 10 ultralight, 15 multi-engine, 2 jet, and 1 glider.

== History ==
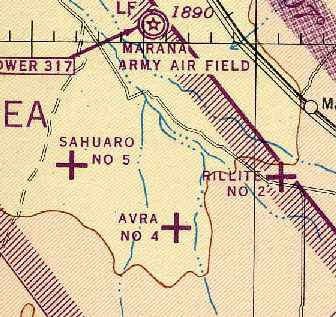
1945 Phoenix sectional chart shows Marana Regional Airport as Marana Auxiliary Army Airfield No. 2 (aka Rillito Field).

In 1943 then Marana Auxiliary Army Airfield No. 2 (a.k.a. Rillito Field) was one of five auxiliary fields that served Marana Army Air Field (now Pinal Airpark) and is part of many Arizona World War II Army Airfields. The United States Army Air Forces trained at Marana through World War II and the Korean War in North American T-6 Texan and North American T-28 Trojan aircraft.

The military sold the airport to a private operator. It was renamed Avra Valley Airport, and in 1968 expanded the runway by 1200 feet. By 1972 there were more than 30 civilian aircraft based at the airport. In 1973 Pima County Department of Transportation bought the airport and expanded the runways even more. Further improvements into 1980s included adding a parking lot, terminal building, and offices. Skyrider Cafe opened in 1983.

In 1999 the Town of Marana bought the airport for Pima County and changed the name to Marana Northwest Regional Airport, then in 2002 renamed it to Marana Regional Airport.

According to the Marana Regional Airport 2017 Airport Master Plan, the airport plans to extend the end of runway 3 to 5,830 ft × 75 ft (1,777 m × 23 m), a 50% increase. A timeline for the improvements has not been specified.

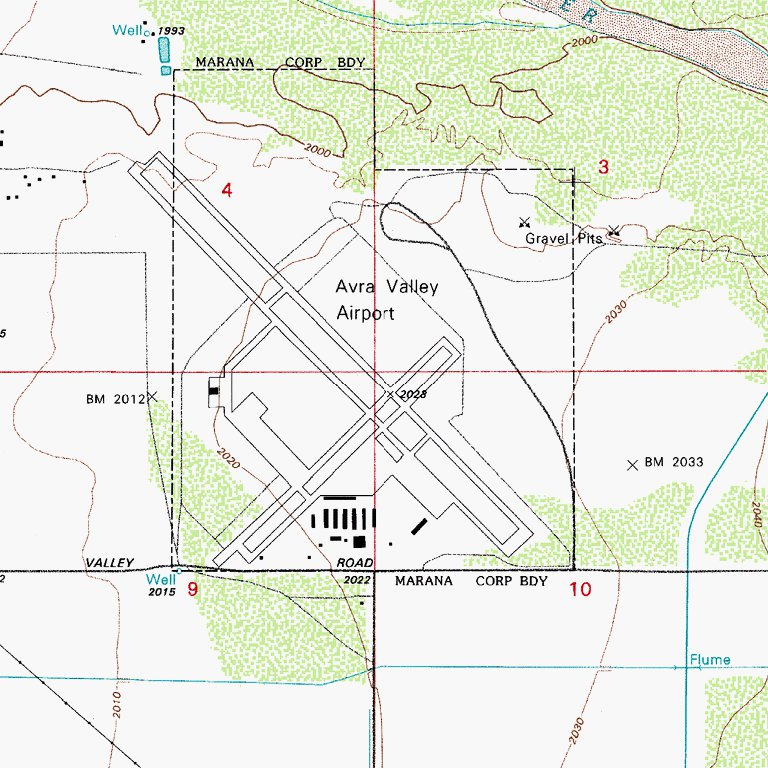
USGS topo of Avra Valley Airport circa 1980s

== Accidents and incidents ==
- On April 8, 2000 a Bell Boeing V-22 Osprey of the United States Marine Corps crashed during a training exercise at the airport killing all 19 on board.
- On February 19, 2025, a Cessna 172S collided with a Lancair 360 MK II over the airport. The two occupants on board the Lancair died after the plane hit the ground, while the two people on board the Cessna landed safely on the airport with no injuries.

== See also ==
- Pinal Airpark
- Arizona World War II Army Airfields
- List of airports in Arizona
