= Marana High School =

Location
- 12000 W. Emigh Road; Tucson, Pima County, Arizona 85743; United States; 32°22′02″N 111°13′15″W

Information
- Type: Public
- Established: 1975 (51 years ago)
- School district: Marana Unified School District
- CEEB code: 030200
- Principal: Caitlyn Kauffman
- Teaching staff: 119.83 (FTE)
- Grades: 9–12
- Enrollment: 2,429 (2023–2024)
- Student to teacher ratio: 20.27
- Campus type: Rural
- Colors: Blue and gold
- Team name: Tigers
- Rival: Mountain View High School
- Website: maranahigh.maranausd.org

Marana High School is one of three high schools operated by the Marana Unified School District for the town of Marana, Arizona. It was established in 1975.

== History ==
The school is the successor to the previous Marana High School (built in 1953), which became the current Marana Middle School. Since 1975, numerous additional buildings have been constructed around the campus. These include the newest gym, named the Patton Gym in honor of Coach Norman Patton, who coached the Tigers' basketball team in the 1960s and 70s, and the Wade McLean Swimming Pool, named after the former superintendent of MUSD. Many other facilities have also been added, such as a greenhouse, external welding shops, and portable classroom buildings, all branching off from the main school.

== Academics ==
=== Fine arts ===
Marana High focuses on the contributions of the arts, with pathways in photography, fine art, digital media, band, orchestra, theatre, dance, guitar, piano, ceramics, and choir.

=== College courses ===
For the 2024-25 school year, Marana High School offers thirty college courses, both in the form of AP classes and dual-enrollment classes through Pima Community College and the University of Arizona, which are eligible for college credit and transfer to other 4-year colleges.

== Athletics ==
Marana High is a member of the Arizona Interscholastic Association. It is a 5A Conference school.

== Clubs and extracurriculars ==
Marana High offers a variety of clubs and extracurriculars for students to join. Some of these clubs are affiliated with national organizations.

Clubs offered through national organizations include:

- Auto, Law, Photo, Software, and Welding through SkillsUSA.
- Culinary and Early Childhood through FCCLA.
- BioMed and SportsMed through HOSA.

Other affiliated programs include:

- Academic Decathlon
- Mu Alpha Theta
- Fellowship of Christian Athletes
- FFA
- Interact Club
- Key Club
- Link Crew
- National Honor Society

== Notable alumni ==
- Trenton Bourguet, quarterback for the Arizona State Sun Devils
- Sherry Cervi, professional rodeo barrel racer; four-time World Champion: 1995, 1999, 2010, 2013
- Rich Hinton, former MLB player (Chicago White Sox, Texas Rangers, New York Yankees, Cincinnati Reds, Seattle Mariners)
- Jordan Morgan, NFL offensive tackle (Green Bay Packers)
- Troy Olsen, country singer
- Ryan Perry, MLB player (Detroit Tigers, Washington Nationals)
- Duke Richardson, four-star general, commander of the Air Force Materiel Command
- Paul Robinson, former NFL running back with (Cincinnati Bengals, Houston Oilers), 2-time Pro Bowl selection, 1968 NFL Rookie of the Year
