= Mountain View High School (Pima County, Arizona) =

Secondary school

Location
- 3901 West Linda Vista Boulevard; Tucson, Arizona 85742; United States; 32°22′48″N 111°2′55″W

Information
- Type: Public secondary
- Motto: Montes Movemus
- Established: 1986 (40 years ago)
- School district: Marana Unified School District
- CEEB code: 030497
- Principal: Delia McCraley
- Faculty: 124
- Teaching staff: 92.00 (FTE)
- Grades: 9th - 12th
- Enrollment: 1,827 (2024–2025)
- Student to teacher ratio: 19.86
- Colors: Black and silver
- Mascot: Monte the Mountain Lion
- Nickname: Mountain Lions
- Rival: Marana High School
- Website: www.maranausd.org/mvhs

Mountain View High School in unincorporated Pima County, Arizona is one of the two high schools in the Marana Unified School District. It opened in 1986, ten years after Mesa's high school with the same name. (The two Mountain Views are Arizona's only two district high schools that share a name.)

== Notable alumni ==
- Jeff Cotton (American football), NFL player
- Demetrius Flannigan-Fowles, NFL player
- Jared Lee Loughner, mass murderer in the 2011 Tucson shooting
- James MacPherson, football player
- Lacey Nymeyer, Olympic swimmer
