= Marana, Arizona =

Town in Pima County, Arizona

- Town
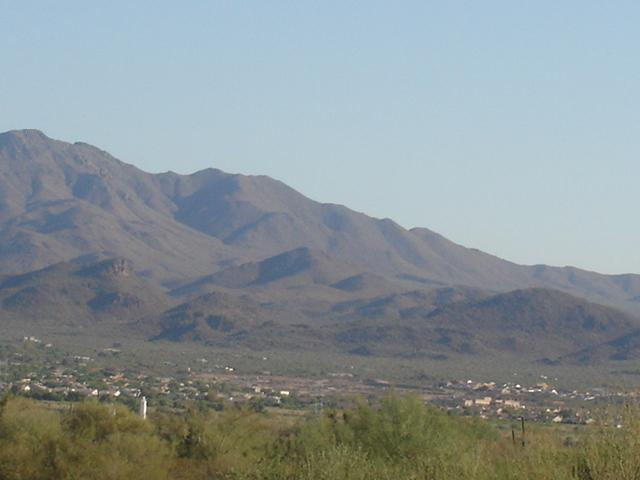
- Marana in the foreground of the Tortolita Mountains.

- Flag

- Location of Marana in Pima County and Pinal County, Arizona

- Location in the United States Marana, Arizona (the United States)
- Coordinates: 32°23′12″N 111°7′32″W
- Country: United States
- State: Arizona
- County: Pima, Pinal
- Incorporated: 1977

Government
  - Type: Council-manager
  - Body: Marana Town Council
  - Mayor: Jon Post (interim)
  - Vice Mayor: Roxanne Ziegler
  - Town Manager: Terry Rozema
  - Town Council: List: • Patrick Cavanaugh; • Patti Comerford; • Herb Kai; • Teri Murphy; • John Officer; • Roxanne Ziegler

Area
  - Total: 121.78 sq mi (315.41 km^{2})
  - Land: 121.10 sq mi (313.65 km^{2})
  - Water: 0.68 sq mi (1.77 km^{2})
- Elevation: 1,991 ft (607 m)

Population (2020)
  - Total: 51,908
  - Density: 429/sq mi (165.5/km^{2})
- Time zone: UTC-7 (MST (no DST))
- ZIP code: 85653, 85658, 85743
- Area code: 520
- FIPS code: 04-44270
- GNIS feature ID: 7681
- Website: maranaaz.gov/Home

Marana (/məˈræ.nə/) is a town that mostly lies in Pima County with a small portion in Pinal County, in the U.S. state of Arizona. It is located northwest of Tucson, Arizona. As of the 2020 census, the population of the town was 51,908.

== History ==
Archaeologists found evidence of about 4,200 years of continuous human settlement in the vicinity of Marana and in the middle of Santa Cruz Valley. Many significant archaeological sites have been found near Marana.

- Las Capas, a large, early agricultural site, is related to the nearby Costello-King site near present-day Ina Road and the Interstate 10 interchange. It was occupied from 4,200 to 2,500 years ago. It is the site of the oldest-known cemetery in the American Southwest and the oldest-known canals in North America. The oldest tobacco pipes in the world were found here.
- Marana Mound, dating between 1150 and 1300 A.D., is the remnant of a large platform mound that was the center of the Hohokam community. The people lived between the Santa Cruz River and the Tortolita Mountains. The mound is surrounded by an adobe compound wall. Multiple rooms were constructed against the wall and were associated with 30–35 nearby residential compounds. Multiple house features have been found both inside and outside the compounds, as well as wall segments and trash mounds. The whole complex covers an area of approximately one square mile.
- Linda Vista Hill, dating between 1200 and 1350 A.D., is a Trincheras culture site in the Tucson Mountains. The people inhabited mountain slopes overlooking arable land along streams. The hillside site has more than 150 terraces and 75 pit houses excavated into the terraces. A massive, adobe-walled compound is located on the hill summit.
- Los Morteros, a Hohokam ballcourt village ruin, is located on the Santa Cruz floodplain near the Point of the Mountain at the northern end of the Tucson Mountains. Los Morteros has also been identified as the probable location of the Llano del Azotado campsite used by the Juan Bautista de Anza expedition in 1775, which was chronicled. The location is near the present-day Arizona Portland Cement Plant in the Town of Marana.
- In 1775, Juan Bautista de Anza, Captain of the Presidio of Tubac, led an expedition north along the Santa Cruz River to find the city of San Francisco. His group of about 200 included 30 soldiers and their families and a number of escorts. They brought more than 1,000 heads of livestock. Their campsite was developed in the 20th century as the CalPortland Cement Plant near Marana. A 15-mile (24 km) segment of the route that the expedition took through Marana is designated as part of the Juan Bautista de Anza National Historic Trail.
- Pointer Mountain Station, of the Butterfield Overland Mail stagecoach line used from 1858, was found during the study of Los Morteros, within the limits of the nearby Puerta del Norte trailer court.

Spanish colonists began to inhabit this area in the 17th and 18th centuries. Over time they intermarried with Native Americans, and a class of mestizo settlers also developed. From the early years, mining and ranching were the chief economic activities. The area became part of the independent Mexican Empire established in 1821 (soon replaced by the Republic of Mexico).

=== US territory ===
More than two decades later, the United States acquired this territory as part of the Gadsden Purchase; it was not part of the Mexican Cession following the defeat in the Mexican-American War, ending in 1848.

=== 20th-century pioneers ===
According to historian David Leighton, Charles B. Anway was the first member of the Anway family in the Tucson area; from the eastern United States, he came because the dry mountain air was thought to be beneficial for people suffering from tuberculosis, as he was. Antibiotics were not yet in general use to treat this disease, which had a high mortality rate and no known cure. In 1919, his brother William and his two children, Louis and Ila, arrived in town, but they decided to settle in an area northwest of Tucson called Postvale, Arizona.

In 1920, the longtime widower William Anway married Orpha Ralston. She had been a member for many years of the Postvale Co-operative Women's Club. This group lobbied to have the local post office renamed from Postvale to Marana; in time, the town was also named Marana.

Marana did not become an agricultural center until after World War I. It has produced commodity crops of cotton, wheat, barley, alfalfa, and pecans.

During World War II, the Army built facilities in Marana to support the military effort, including the Marana Airfield (1942–45, now the Pinal Airpark). It became the largest pilot-training center in the world, training some 10,000 flyers.

After the Brown v. Board of Education decision in 1954, farmers against integration forced Black farmers out of Marana into nearby Rillito, Arizona.

In 1962, Marana experienced severe flash floods during the landfall of Tropical Storm Claudia. In 1983, Marana was one of five Arizona towns which were almost entirely flooded by the Tropical Storm Octave. The Octave system is considered the cause of the worst flood in Pima County history. It is also regarded as the worst tropical system to affect Arizona.

In March 1977, the town incorporated about 10 square miles (26 km^{2}) and in August of that year, the 1,500 residents elected their first town council. In early 1979, the town began to grow through a targeted annexation policy. It now measures a little more than 120 square miles (310 km^{2}).

=== Annexation ===
The southern portion of Marana has grown considerably since the early 1990s with the addition of businesses and housing due to the annexation of existing unincorporated areas. In 1992, the Marana Town Council voted to annex an area of unincorporated Pima County that was located southeast of the town limits. The area selected was a narrow corridor of land along Interstate 10 to the east along Ina Road and south along Thornydale Road. These areas were mainly developed with high-density commercial businesses and shopping centers including large retailers or "big box" stores. Marana chose these areas to annex to increase its revenue from sales taxes. The large residential areas behind these commercial areas, which required support for residents, such as schools and roads, were not annexed.

As a result, Tucson filed a lawsuit in the Pima County Superior Court (City of Tucson v Town of Marana), claiming that Marana illegally annexed the unincorporated areas in violation of existing state laws. However, on April 4, 1994, Judge Lina Rodriguez ruled in favor of Marana, allowing the annexation to stand. Following this suit, state annexation laws were changed, forbidding municipalities from annexing small strips of land without taking large surrounding parcels as well. Such "strip annexation" is no longer allowed under Arizona law.

On 8 April 2000, a V-22 Osprey aircraft operated by the United States Marine Corps crashed during a night training exercise at the Marana Regional Airport. All 19 Marines aboard the aircraft were killed. The crash resulted in a two-month moratorium on V-22 test flights and further postponed its entry into operational military service.

== Geography ==
Marana is located at 32°23′12″N 111°7′32″W (32.386539, -111.125437).

According to the United States Census Bureau, the town has a total area of 121.4 square miles (314 km^{2}), of which 120.7 square miles (313 km^{2}) is land and 0.7 square miles (1.8 km^{2}) (1.22%) is water.

The town extends along Interstate 10 from the line between Pinal and Pima counties to the Tucson city line, except for the area around the unincorporated community of Rillito. The town has a history of farming and ranching. Marana is located in the Sonoran Desert and is surrounded by the Tortolita Mountains, the Santa Catalina Mountains, and the Tucson Mountains. It includes the Dove Mountain area.

The Tucson Mountains and the western half of Saguaro National Park are located to the south. Phoenix is approximately 90 minutes northwest via Interstate 10.

== Climate ==
Marana has a hot semi-arid climate (Köppen climate classification BSh). This is characterized by hot summers and relatively mild winters. The area averages only 12.19 inches (310 mm) of annual rainfall. During the dry and sunny winter months, daytime highs usually reach between 60 and 70 °F (16 and 21 °C), with temperatures cooling to well below 50 °F (10 °C), and sometimes below 40 °F (4 °C) during the night. Temperatures below the freezing mark are not uncommon during this period. In the summer, high temperatures range between 95 and 105 °F (35 and 41 °C), with nights cooling down to around 70 °F (21 °C). The occasional heat wave can cause temperatures to soar above 110 °F (43 °C) for multiple days during the hot summer months. Rain is much more frequent during the summer due to the North American Monsoon, and is sometimes accompanied by high winds and thunderstorms. Due to its lower elevation and less pronounced urban heat island effect, Marana generally sees slightly warmer daytime temperatures and cooler nighttime temperatures than Tucson.

Climate data for Marana, AZ
| Month | Jan | Feb | Mar | Apr | May | Jun | Jul | Aug | Sep | Oct | Nov | Dec | Year |
|---|---|---|---|---|---|---|---|---|---|---|---|---|---|
| Record high °F (°C) | 87 (31) | 90 (32) | 97 (36) | 104 (40) | 108 (42) | 116 (47) | 115 (46) | 113 (45) | 109 (43) | 106 (41) | 95 (35) | 88 (31) | 116 (47) |
| Mean daily maximum °F (°C) | 66 (19) | 69 (21) | 75 (24) | 83 (28) | 92 (33) | 101 (38) | 101 (38) | 99 (37) | 96 (36) | 86 (30) | 75 (24) | 66 (19) | 84 (29) |
| Mean daily minimum °F (°C) | 39 (4) | 42 (6) | 46 (8) | 52 (11) | 61 (16) | 69 (21) | 74 (23) | 72 (22) | 68 (20) | 57 (14) | 46 (8) | 39 (4) | 55 (13) |
| Record low °F (°C) | 15 (−9) | 19 (−7) | 26 (−3) | 27 (−3) | 42 (6) | 51 (11) | 51 (11) | 46 (8) | 46 (8) | 35 (2) | 26 (−3) | 21 (−6) | 15 (−9) |
| Average precipitation inches (mm) | 1.01 (26) | 1.03 (26) | 0.93 (24) | 0.34 (8.6) | 0.24 (6.1) | 0.17 (4.3) | 2.10 (53) | 2.47 (63) | 1.33 (34) | 0.86 (22) | 0.58 (15) | 1.13 (29) | 12.19 (310) |
Source: The Weather Channel

== Demographics ==
Historical population
| Census | Pop. | Note | %± |
|---|---|---|---|
| 1970 | 1,154 | | — |
| 1980 | 1,674 | | 45.1% |
| 1990 | 2,187 | | 30.6% |
| 2000 | 13,556 | | 519.8% |
| 2010 | 34,961 | | 157.9% |
| 2020 | 51,908 | | 48.5% |
| 2022 (est.) | 55,962 | ▲ | 7.8% |
U.S. Decennial Census

=== Racial and ethnic composition ===
Marana town, Arizona – Racial composition Note: the US Census treats Hispanic/Latino as an ethnic category. This table excludes Latinos from the racial categories and assigns them to a separate category. Hispanics/Latinos may be of any race.
| Race (NH = Non-Hispanic) | 2020 | 2010 | 2000 | 1990 | 1980 |
|---|---|---|---|---|---|
| White alone (NH) | 63.1% (32,742) | 68.8% (24,050) | 71.7% (9,718) | 62.3% (1,362) | 52.1% (872) |
| Black alone (NH) | 2.5% (1,307) | 2.3% (806) | 2.8% (381) | 1.5% (32) | 4.2% (71) |
| American Indian alone (NH) | 0.7% (348) | 0.8% (282) | 1.7% (227) | 5.1% (112) | 7.1% (119) |
| Asian alone (NH) | 3.9% (2,026) | 3.7% (1,280) | 2.3% (318) | 1.3% (29) | |
| Pacific Islander alone (NH) | 0.2% (78) | 0.1% (34) | 0.1% (18) | | |
| Other race alone (NH) | 0.5% (235) | 0.2% (76) | 0% (5) | 0.1% (3) | |
| Multiracial (NH) | 4.1% (2,120) | 2% (703) | 1.7% (226) | — | — |
| Hispanic/Latino (any race) | 25.1% (13,052) | 22.1% (7,730) | 19.6% (2,663) | 29.7% (649) | 36.6% (612) |

=== 2020 census ===
As of the 2020 census, Marana had a population of 51,908. The median age was 41.1 years. 23.5% of residents were under the age of 18 and 21.4% were 65 years of age or older. For every 100 females there were 97.4 males, and for every 100 females age 18 and over there were 95.9 males age 18 and over.

88.6% of residents lived in urban areas, while 11.4% lived in rural areas.

There were 19,655 households in Marana, of which 32.7% had children under the age of 18 living in them. Of all households, 62.6% were married-couple households, 12.9% were households with a male householder and no spouse or partner present, and 18.4% were households with a female householder and no spouse or partner present. About 19.6% of all households were made up of individuals and 9.1% had someone living alone who was 65 years of age or older.

There were 21,521 housing units, of which 8.7% were vacant. The homeowner vacancy rate was 1.6% and the rental vacancy rate was 7.6%.

=== 2010 census ===
As of the census of 2010, there were 34,961 people, 11,759 households, and 8,871 families residing in the town. There were 13,706 housing units and the racial makeup of the town was 81.9% White, 4.6% Black or African American, 0.7% Native American, 5.2% Asian, 0.1% Pacific Islander, 9.7% from other races, and 2.2% from two or more races. 21.7% of the population were Hispanic or Latino of any race.

There were 11,759 households, out of which 32.5% had children under the age of 18 living with them, 63.2% were married couples living together, 8.2% had a female householder with no husband present, and 24.6% were non-families. 19.3% of all households were made up of individuals, and 5.1% had someone living alone who was 65 years of age or older. The average household size was 2.81, and the average family size was 3.17.

In the town, the population was spread out, with 26.7% under the age of 18, 7.4% from 18 to 24, 34.3% from 25 to 44, 22.1% from 45 to 64, and 9.5% who were 65 years of age or older. The median age was 37 years. The Town is 50.1% female and 49.9% male.

The median income for a household in the town was $68,361, and the median income for a family was $75,281. Males had a median income of $58,932 versus $37,388 for females. The per capita income for the town was $28,468. About 6.1% of families and 8.1% of the population were below the poverty line, including 15.0% of those under age 18 and 2.3% of those aged 65 or over.

== Economy ==
Asarco's Silver Bell mine is located near Marana.

=== Principal employers ===
According to Marana's 2022 Annual Comprehensive Financial Report, the principal employers in the city are;

| # | Employer | # of Employees |
|---|---|---|
| 1 | Marana Unified School District | 922 |
| 2 | Town of Marana | 403 |
| 3 | Marana Main Health Center | 356 |
| 4 | Walmart | 343 |
| 5 | Ritz-Carlton Dove Mountain | 320 |
| 6 | Fry's Food & Drug | 315 |
| 7 | Sargent Aerospace & Defense | 311 |
| 8 | Northwest Fire District | 278 |
| 9 | Costco | 250 |
| 10 | FLSmidth Krebs | 239 |

== Transportation ==
Marana is served by Interstate 10. Sun Tran operates its Sun Shuttle service to Tucson as well an express route to downtown Tucson.

Marana Regional Airport is a general aviation airport owned by the town of Marana. It does not serve commercial flights; Tucson International Airport and Phoenix Sky Harbor International Airport are the closest commercial airports.

== Town facts ==
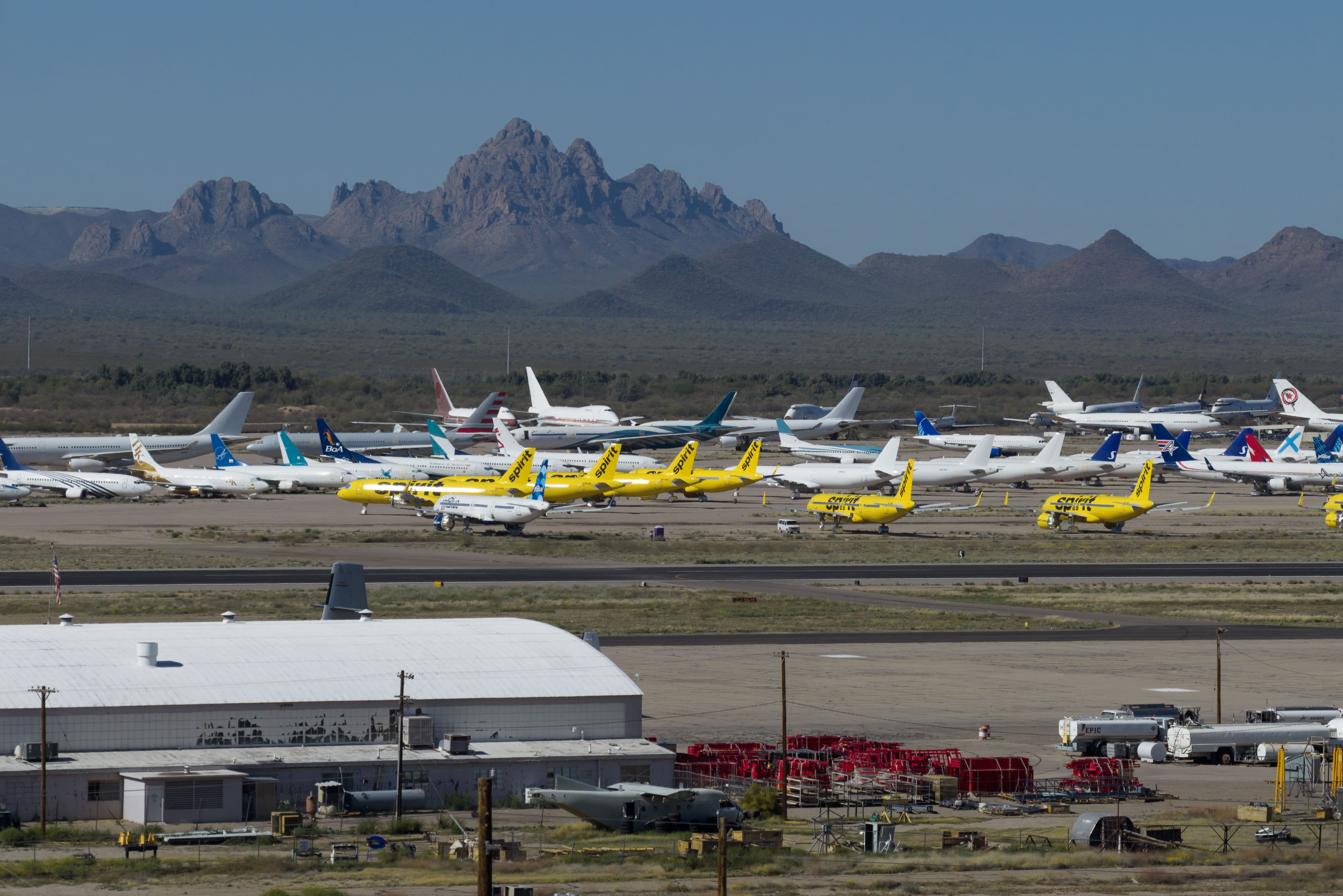
Pinal Airpark

- Marana was named for the Spanish word maraña ("thicket") by 19th-century railroad workers who had to clear a line through the area.
- In 2007, Marana began hosting the PGA Tour's WGC-Accenture Match Play Championship (now the WGC-Cadillac Match Play Championship). Held in late February, the event included the world's top 64 professional golfers. Henrik Stenson won the inaugural event, and Tiger Woods won in 2008. Geoff Ogilvy won the 2009 event. Ian Poulter won the 2010 event and Luke Donald took the 2011 title. The tournament remained in Marana through 2014. (In September 2014, Cadillac was announced as the new title sponsor for 2015, and the event was moved to San Francisco's TPC Harding Park golf course.)
- Pinal Airpark (Evergreen International Aviation) is located just north of Marana in Pinal County. Many commercial airlines send their airplanes to this site for storage. It was well known in the 1970s and 1980s as an air base for the CIA. The airport was said to be a U.S. Forest Service air tanker base, but when a series of forest fires broke out in the mountains surrounding Tucson in the early 1970s, Airpark officials had to admit that these places were not Forest Service tankers. Locals had asked for them to put out the fires. Airpark officials said these were actually paramilitary cargo planes. Access to the Airpark is stringently monitored.

=== Veterans Cemetery ===
Marana is home to one of the four Arizona state Veterans Memorial Cemeteries. Since it was developed in 2016 by the Arizona Department of Veterans' Services, over 2,450 burials have been undertaken.

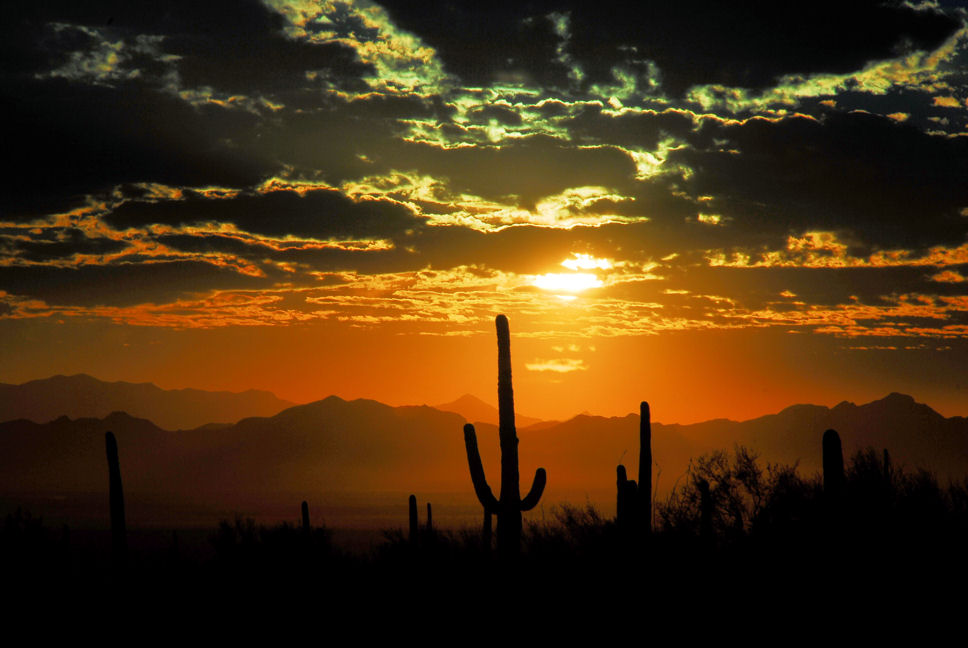
Sunset over Marana

== Education ==
The majority of the town is located within the Marana Unified School District. This district consists of 16 schools.

Flowing Wells Unified School District covers the town's extreme southeastern section. Additionally, the portion of the town within Pinal County is served by Red Rock Elementary School District and Santa Cruz Valley Union High School District.

== Notable people ==
- James C. Riley, US Army lieutenant general
