= Active 20-30 Club =

International service club for children and young adults

Active 20-30 Club Logo
- Founded: 1922
- Founders: Active International: Ernest Axland, Paul Arthand, Carl Morck, Carl Springer, Carl Teman, Edgar Jones and Pat McNamara 20-30 International: Paul Clairborne
- Type: Service
- Purpose: Leadership Development / Disadvantaged Youth
- Location: Currently Sacramento, California
- Origins: Sacramento, California and Aberdeen, Washington, United States
- Region served: North, South and Central America
- Method: Community service
- Website: http://www.active20-30.org/

Active 20-30 International is an international service club focused on helping children and developing leadership skills in younger adults ages 20–39. In the United States and Canada, the organization is called the Active 20-30 Club and has over 28 local chapters. In Latin America, the group is called Activo 20-30 Internacional (for its name in Spanish) and has over 60 chapters.

== History ==
Active 20-30 International is the result of the fusion of two Clubs, Active International and 20-30 International. Both were created to give younger adults the opportunity to lead, as leadership positions in established service clubs at that time were dominated by older men.

=== Active International ===
Active International was founded on Aberdeen, Washington February 10, 1922, as The Active Club. A group of young men including Ernest Axland, Paul Arthand, Carl Morck, Carl Springer, Carl Teman, Edgar Jones, and Pat McNamara was eager to give the young men a more active part in the affairs of the community. Thus, they formed together to establish a young men's club which they named "Active". Active was incorporated under the laws of the State of Washington on August 20, 1924. Before long, Active Clubs were formed in Elma, Hoquiam, Montesano, and Olympia.

In 1925 the first convention was held in Montesano, Washington, with Carl Morck of Aberdeen being elected as president. In the same year, the name of the organization was officially changed from Active Club to Active Club International.

The National Offices of Active International have been located in Aberdeen, Tacoma, Raymond and Spokane, Washington; Portland, Oregon; and Vancouver, British Columbia, Canada.

=== 20-30 Club ===
20-30 Club was founded in Sacramento, CA, in the fall of 1922. Paul W. Claiborne was just twenty years of age when he conceived the idea of forming a service club whose members would consist of young men. Together with Earl B. Casey, Alfred B. Franke, Charles G. McBride, and Marshall A. Page, he went with his idea to Mitch Nathan, the president of the Sacramento Chamber of Commerce. Nathan approved of his plan and appointed a committee to foster the formation of a club whose activities would aid the growth and advancement of young men. This committee consisted of F.A.S. "Sandy" Foale, chairman; Charles Hansen, Clinton Harbor, Joseph Quire, and Mrs. Alva Archer. A meeting was held in the Chamber of Commerce building on Tuesday, December 12, 1922, with Judge Peter J. Shields as the speaker. It was decided to proceed with the organization's work immediately. Upon the suggestion of Sandy Foale, the name 20-30 was adopted.

An organizational meeting was held on December 19, 1922, and Paul Claiborne was unanimously elected as the first president. Sandy Foale was named chairman of the advisory board. After the Sacramento club had established itself, 20-30 began to expand to new areas.

On March 10, 1924, the Stockton, California, club was chartered with the assistance of the Rotary Club in Stockton. G. Lewis Fox was elected president, and Dr. Hall was named chairman of the advisory board. A meeting between Sacramento and Stockton was held on March 5, 1925, and they created the 20-30 Club Executive Council to help with expansion to other cities. In August 1925, the third Club, San Bernardino, California, becomes affiliated with the organization.

In 1926, 20-30 Clubs were formed in San Francisco, Hayward, Tracy, and Oakland. Delegates from the seven clubs met in San Francisco on August 21, 1926. This was the first convention of 20–30. A Constitution was adopted and the following officers were elected: Sumner Mering, President; Tom Louttit, Vice President; Ivan Shoemaker, Secretary/Treasurer.

=== Expansion of the Active and 20-30 organizations ===
In June 1929, Active International became international in fact, as well as in name, with the chartering of the Vancouver International Club in Vancouver, British Columbia, Canada. Active clubs soon spread through Washington, Oregon, California and Montana in the United States and the provinces of British Columbia and Alberta in Canada. Clubs were also located in Idaho, Hawaii, and Washington D.C.

From 20 to 30's inception in 1922 until December 1941, charters were granted to 260 clubs, and a total membership of 4,675 was attained. During the war years, approximately 65 percent of the membership served in the armed forces. This compelled 68 clubs to disband and decreased the number of active clubs to 122 with an active membership of 1,800. In many cases, the clubs were kept on active status by one or two members who maintained the charter.

The official start of international expansion into Latin countries started is up for debate. It was widely believed that the chartering of the Juarez Club on February 16, 1944, so started the movement of 20–30 in Mexico and Latin America. However, new evidence points to the first real international presence beginning in 1933 when the El Paso, Texas, the club was chartered and possibly the Juarez, Mexico Club as well. It was a result of the Juarez charter and that of other Mexican clubs that the name of the association was changed to 20-30 International at the 1946 Victory Convention.

=== Merger ===
Both 20-30 International and Active International were chartered members of the World Council of Young Men's Service Clubs. John Armenia, Joe Crowe and Arnie Scheldt of Active and Dr. James Vernetti, Henry Heyl, and Ray Fletcher of 20-30 were among those who fostered the World Council movement up to its formal beginning in 1945.

In 1959 President Norm Morrison of 20-30 and President Ken Helling of Active exchanged a letter and renewed the long-standing proposal that these two almost identical young men's service clubs should merge. Throughout 1959 and 1960 meetings were held between the two groups, culminating in the proposed Constitution, and resolution to be presented to the 1960 conventions of each organization.

At the 20-30 International Convention held in Santa Cruz, CA in 1960, the delegates unanimously adopted the merger proposal and the Constitution. One month later, the delegates at the Active International Convention in Calgary, Alberta, also unanimously adopted the propositions. Therefore, on August 1, 1960, Active International and 20-30 International became Active 20-30 International.

The first convention of Active 20-30 International was held in Tucson, AZ, July 10–14, 1961, where the Constitution and By-Laws were officially adopted. Jack Kummert was elected president; Federico G. Lugo as First Vice-president; James Robertson as Second Vice-president. Clint McClure and Owen Barnes, the last presidents of 20-30 and Active respectively, stayed as members of the International Directors Council as Immediate Past Presidents.

Other members of the First Council of Directors of Active 20-30 International were: Ray Manges, Area 1; Norm Jensen, Area 2; Skeet Glidewell, Area 3; Forrest K. Stewart, Area 4; Roy Stype, Area 5; Emilio Pérez-Banuet, Area 6; Joaquin Bours, associate director of Area 6; Angel Moreno, Area 7 and Bob Baumgartner, Area 8.

Its presence became so large, that the State of California and Governor Ronald Reagan declared February 20–26, 1967 "Active 20-30 Week"

== Active 20-30 International ==
=== Philosophy ===
The original Active International and 20-30 International clubs started as a result of younger members of other service organizations finding that most leadership positions in those organizations were held and reserved for, the older and more senior members. The idea of a time limit for membership was intended to help build leadership and responsibility. The club as a whole focuses on helping children, specifically those that have special needs or are disadvantaged. Local clubs apply that focus to their specific cities and towns.

=== Symbols and sayings ===
The symbols and sayings of the organization are typically adaptations of those of Active International and 20-30 International or a confluence of both.

==== Emblem ====
The Active 20-30 International emblem is a buzz saw encircling an hourglass and inscribed "Active 20-30 International."

The emblem selected for Active International was the buzz saw; it was considered to represent intense activity, which the club sought to identify with. The buzz saw was also said to serve as a symbol for the community, with Aberdeen being a center in the lumber industry.

The emblem of 20-30 International was an hourglass, symbolizing the passage of time and the need for young men to take advantage of their time and energy for useful activities. Around this hourglass, there were four letter S's. The four S's also were said to have the significance of representing the first four 20-30 Clubs (Sacramento, Stockton, San Bernardino, and San Francisco); they also were used to form the original slogan "Sincerity in Service, our Slogan for Success".

Upon the merger, a new emblem was developed incorporating both symbols. The 4 "S" were removed and the hourglass was placed within a 23-tooth buzzsaw.

==== Mission statement ====
The mission statement is "Providing young adults with an opportunity for personal growth, friendship, and leadership development while improving the quality of life for the underserved children in our community."

==== Motto ====
The club's motto is "Youth, to be served, must serve" and the club slogan is "One never stands so tall as when kneeling to help a child.”

==== Colors ====
The club's colors are red, blue, and gold.

=== Membership ===
Local clubs include women's chapters, men's chapters, and co-ed chapters. The age requirement to be a member is 20–39 to allow for youth leadership training. Honorary members can be of any age. Many Active 20-30 Clubs partner with other service clubs, such as Kiwanis, Rotary, Lions Club, and Soroptimist, and Active 20-30 Club members often join these groups later on in life.

==== Notable members and alumni ====
- Rafael Ángel Alfaro-Pineda - Former El Salvador Deputy Secretary of State and Salvadorian Ambassador to Israel, Venezuela, Ecuador & Canada. Member of San Salvador #552.
- Hugh M. Burns - former Senate President Pro Tem of California State Senate, co-author of the legislation that authorized the California State Water Project and past member of Fresno #12.
- Jack M. Campbell - 21st Governor of New Mexico. Member of Albuquerque #103.
- Randolph Collier - 37 year California State Senator known as "The Father of the California Freeways". Past President of Yreka #101
- H.E. Juan Ricardo De Dianous - Panamanian Ambassador to the United States and former president of the National Bank of Panama.
- Ted DeGrazia - American impressionist, painter, sculptor, composer, actor, director, designer, architect, jeweler, and lithographer. Charter member of Bisbee, AZ #136.
- Joe Dini - Nevada state assemblyman and casino owner. Past district governor and Active Member of Yerington #54.
- Clyde Doyle - Member of the U.S. House of Representatives from California's 18th congressional district and honorary member of Long Beach #29.
- Jose Napoleon Duarte - 39th President of El Salvador and founder of Active 20–30 in El Salvador.
- Alfred J. Elliott - Democratic Representative from California. Honorary member of Tulare #45
- Marvin Fishman - Using the stage name Bob Marvin, portrayed Flippo, the King of Clowns on WBNS for 27 years. Honorary member of Marion #441
- Barry Goldwater - United States Senator from Arizona. Charter Member of Phoenix #99
- Barry Goldwater Jr. - Former member of the United States House of Representatives from California's 20th congressional district and member of Los Angeles #34.
- George L. Graziadio, Jr. - American commercial real estate developer, banker and philanthropist. Namesake of Pepperdine Graziadio School of Business and Management. Member of Morningside Park #286, Past International President and Past President of The World Council of Service Clubs.
- Sherrill Halbert - Former United States Federal Judge, Past National President of the Association of 20-30 Clubs, 1932. Member of Porterville #28.
- Brutus Hamilton - Renowned Track and Field Coach, Silver Medalist at the 1920 Summer Olympics in the decathlon. Honorary Member of Berkeley #47.
- George V. Hansen - Congressman from Idaho's 2nd congressional district. Past president of the Pocatello Idaho club.
- Don Hummel - American businessman and former mayor of Tucson. Former member of Tucson #82.
- Barry Keene - Former Chair of the California Senate Judiciary Committee, and later the California Senate Majority Leader. Former member of Santa Rosa #50.
- Anthony Kennedy - Associate Justice of the Supreme Court of the United States who was appointed by President Ronald Reagan in 1988.
- Robert L. Leggett - Former U.S. Representative for California's 4th congressional district and past president of Vallejo #79
- Charles Lindbergh - Famed Aviator and Honorary Life Member of Chehalis Club. Honorary Member of Stockton #2.
- Bob Matsui - 14-term congressman for California's 5th congressional district. Past President Sacramento #1.
- Dick Maugg - Home builder and developer known for his role as Ed Jaymes in the highly successful 1980s ad campaign for Bartles & Jaymes. Past member of Santa Rosa #50
- Roy Mikkelsen - Former Olympic Skier, US Ski Hall of Fame member and past mayor of Auburn, CA. Former member of Auburn #19.
- Jim Musick - Former football player for University of Southern California and the Boston Redskins. Sheriff of Orange County, CA Past President of Santa Ana #22.
- Richard Nixon - 37th President of the United States. Past President of Whittier #51
- Frank Owen III - Former Texas legislator and Past President of El Paso #96.
- Sam Pick - Former mayor of Santa Fe, New Mexico. Honorary Member of Santa Fe Club.
- John Quebedeaux - Former State Treasurer of Arizona, Auto dealer and Past President of Phoenix #99.
- George Radanovich - Former U.S. Representative for California's 19th congressional district and past president of Clovis, CA #404.
- Joseph A. Rattigan - California State Senator from 1959 to 1966 and served 18 years as justice of the Northern California district of the state Court of Appeal. Past Active Life of Santa Rosa #50.
- Byrl Salsman - Former California State Assemblyman, 30th District and Mayor of Palo Alto. Member of Palo Alto #25.
- Frank Sinatra - Famed singer and actor. Honorary member of Portland #122.
- Charles A. Sprague - 22nd Governor of Oregon. Honorary member of Klamath Falls #84.
- Elbridge Amos Stuart - Founder of Carnation. Honorary member of Pomona #9.
- Fred Taylor - Former men's basketball coach for Ohio State University and baseball player for the Washington Senators. Honorary member of Marion #441
- Fred Telonicher - Former head football coach, professor of zoology and namesake of Fred Telonicher Marine Laboratory at Humboldt State University. Past member of Arcata #86.
- James B. Utt - U.S. representative from Orange County from 1953 to 1970. Past President of Santa Ana #22.
- Bob Wian - founder of Bob's Big Boy and the national Big Boy restaurant chain. Past president of Glendale, CA #131, and past governor of Southern California district.
- Bob Wilson - Member of the United States House of Representatives from 30th, 36th, 40th and 41st districts. Past president of San Diego #62.
- Pete Wilson - 36th governor of California, former United States Senator, mayor of San Diego and a California State Assemblyman. Honorary Member of San Diego #62.

== Organizational structure ==
The Active 20-30 Club is organized locally, nationally, and internationally.

=== United States ===
Current active clubs in the United States include: Albuquerque, Bakersfield, Brentwood, Carson City, Carson Valley, Eugene, Glendale, Gold Rush, Greater Folsom, Greater Roseville/So. Placer Co., Greater Sacramento, Hangtown, Healdsburg, Madera, Merced, Napa, Rohnert Park & Cotati, Petaluma, Phoenix, Redding, Redwood Empire, Sacramento, Santa Rosa, Sebastopol, Southern Arizona, Tucson, Valley of the Sun.

==== Regions ====
Local chapters are divided into larger bodies. In the United States, there are six regions:

- Region 1: Dormant
- Region 2: I5 Corridor from Sacramento to Portland
- Region 3: Arizona, New Mexico, and New York
- Region 4: Nevada, California Sierras and Central California
- Region 5: San Francisco Bay Area & North Coast

In Latin America, each country is divided into its own region known as an association.

=== Latin America ===
Current active clubs in Latin America include:

==== Colombia ====
Armenia, Barrancabermeja, Bogotá, Cali, Manizales, Pereira

==== Costa Rica ====
San Jose, Limón, Tilarán, Tres Ríos, Metropoli

==== Dominican Republic ====
Azua, Baní, Barahona, La Vega, Mao, Moca, Nagua, Padre Las Casas, San Francisco de Macorís, Santiago, Santo Domingo, San Cristóbal, San Juan de la Maguana, Villa Vásquez

==== El Salvador ====
San Salvador, San Miguel, San Vicente, San Salvador Centro, Usulután and San Francisco Gotera

==== Mexico ====
Delicias, Camargo, Juárez, Chihuahua, Mukira, Ensenada, Mulier, Los Mochis, Somachi, Meoqui, Saucillo, Cuauhtémoc, Michoacán

==== Nicaragua ====
Managua Capital, Granada

==== Panama ====
Aguadulce, Boquete, Colón Sur, Changuinola, Chitré, David, La Concepción, Las Cumbres, Las Tablas, Panamá, Panamá Noreste, Panamá Oeste, Panamá Pacífico, Penonomé, Puerto Armuelles, Santiago, Tierras Altas

=== National/International interaction ===
Each country has its own national governing body. In the US and Canada, the composition is unique due to the considerable size and geographic reach of the association's membership. The national board is composed of the nine elected officers which include the regional directors (one per region), the national president-elect, national president, and the immediate past national president as well as three appointed positions; national treasurer, executive director, and the international relations officer (IRO).

In other countries, the governing body is called the Council of Presidents. Each individual club is represented by its president. Also included are the national president-elect, national president, and the immediate past national president as well as the appointed positions; national treasurer, national secretary, and the IRO.

The International Board for the International Organization has representation by each national president and includes the international president-elect, international president as well as the appointed positions; international treasurer, international secretary and the IRO.

=== Global ===
The Active 20-30 Club was previously a part of a global group called the WOCO Foundation, the World Council of Service Organizations. This includes the Round Table India, Round Table Austria, Round Table Belgium, Round Table Cyprus, Round Table Kenya, Round Table France, Round Table Germany, Round Table Israel, Round Table Italy, Ladies Circle: India, Round Table Malta, Round Table Mauritius, Round Table Nepal, Round Table Portugal, Round Table Seychelles, Round Table Sri Lanka, Round Table Switzerland, and Apex Bangladesh.

== Sexual misconduct and assault allegations ==
In April 2021, the San Francisco Chronicle reported that several women who were members of the group alleged a prominent male member engaged in unwanted sexual behavior towards them, in some cases including allegations of harassment or assault. In the wake of the allegations, the Active 20-30 Club commissioned an internal investigation.
