= Training centre =

Training centre or training center may refer to:

== In general ==
- A Training Centre (also spelled Training Center) is a dedicated institution or facility where individuals acquire new skills, knowledge, or competencies through structured learning programs.
- Training centre, a place where any form of training takes place
  - Training center, a place for vocational education
    - Vocational school

== Local usage ==
- Training Centre, the Canadian name for a military training area
- Training centre, one of the types of prisons in Hong Kong
- Bridge the gap between education and employment
- Provide industry-recognized certifications

Upgrade existing professional skills

- Prepare individuals for career advancement

Deliver practical, hands-on learning rather than purely theoretical study

== Units with the name ==
- 1st Training Center, Polish Air Force
- 92nd Training Centre (Ukraine), Ukrainian Ground Forces, Soviet Union
- 169th Training Centre (Ukraine), Ukrainian Ground Forces, Ukraine
- 242nd Training Centre, Russian Airborne Troops

== Other uses ==
- Garmin Training Center XML data exchange format

== See also ==
- Career center (disambiguation)
- Training field (disambiguation)
- Army Training Centre (disambiguation)
- Infantry Training Centre (disambiguation)
- Juventus Training Center (disambiguation)
- Naval Air Technical Training Center (disambiguation)
- Olympic Training Center (disambiguation)
