= 2nd Flying Training Centre =

2nd Training Center
- Active: 1960 - present
- Country: Poland
- Allegiance: Polish Air Force
- Type: Training Unit
- Role: Training
- Base: 1st Airport Station

Aircraft flown
- Trainer: PZL-130

2nd Training Centre (Polish: 2 Osrodek Szkolenia Lotniczego - 2.OSL) is a training unit of Polish Air Force. Unit is stationed in 1st Airport Station in Radom and operates PZL-130 trainer.

== See also ==
- 1st Flying Training Centre
- 1st Tactical Squadron
- 3rd Tactical Squadron
- 7th Tactical Squadron
- 8th Tactical Squadron
- 10th Tactical Squadron
- 41st Tactical Squadron
- 2nd Airlift Squadron
- 13th Airlift Squadron
- 14th Airlift Squadron
- 36th Special Aviation Regiment
