= 1st Flying Training Centre =

1st Training Center
- 1.OSL
- Country: Poland
- Allegiance: Polish Air Force
- Type: Training Unit
- Role: Training
- Base: 6th Air Base (Air Force Academy)

Aircraft flown
- Multirole helicopter: PZL SW-4 Puszczyk
- Utility helicopter: Mil Mi-2 Holplite
- Trainer: TS-11, PZL-130
- Transport: PZL M-28

1st Training Centre (Polish: 1 Osrodek Szkolenia Lotniczego - 1.OSL) is a training unit of Polish Air Force directly under command of Polish Air Force Academy. Unit is stationed on 6th Air Base in Dęblin and operates various training aircraft.

== Equipment ==
| Aircraft | Origin | Type | In service | Notes |
|---|---|---|---|---|
| PZL TS-11 Iskra | Poland | Trainer | 54 | Jet Engine |
| PZL-130 Orlik | Poland | Trainer | 28 | Propeller Engine |
| PZL SW-4 Puszczyk | Poland | Light Helicopter | 2 | 18 on order |
| Mil Mi-2 Hoplite | Poland / Soviet Union | Light Utility Helicopter | 16 | Superseded by PZL SW-4 |
| PZL M-28 Skytruck | Poland | Light Utility Aircraft | ? | Cargo Duties |

== See also ==
- 2nd Flying Training Centre
- 1st Tactical Squadron
- 3rd Tactical Squadron
- 7th Tactical Squadron
- 8th Tactical Squadron
- 10th Tactical Squadron
- 41st Tactical Squadron
- 2nd Airlift Squadron
- 13th Airlift Squadron
- 14th Airlift Squadron
- 36th Special Aviation Regiment
