= List of accidents and incidents involving military aircraft (2000–2009) =

This is a list of accidents and incidents involving military aircraft grouped by the year in which the accident or incident occurred. Not all of the aircraft were in operation at the time. For more exhaustive lists, see the baaa-acro.com archives or the aviation-safety.net database. Combat losses are not included except for a very few cases denoted by singular circumstances.

== Aircraft terminology ==
Information on aircraft gives the type, and if available, the serial number of the operator in italics, the constructors number, also known as the manufacturer's serial number (c/n), exterior codes in apostrophes, nicknames (if any) in quotation marks, flight callsign in italics, and operating units.

For this list, the criteria used for a military aircraft will be: any fixed-wing or rotary-wing aircraft that is operated by a governmental organization such as United States Department of Defense or British Armed Forces in either combat or non-combat missions. The aircraft will fall into categories such as fighter, bomber, attack, search and rescue, transport or training.

== 2000 ==
=== March ===
14 March
Indian Air Force trainer crashed near Hyderabad, killing 1 instructor on board. His Trainee survived. Sqn Ldr Vishal Mehta was killed while trying to bail out of the trainer aircraft which developed a technical snag.

=== April ===
8 April
A Bell Helicopter and Boeing Rotorcraft Systems manufactured MV-22B Osprey tiltrotor prototype, BuNo 165436, coded 'MX-04', of HMX-1, (Nighthawk 72) rolled over and crashed at Marana Northwest Regional Airport, Marana, Arizona, United States, killing all 19 United States Marines on board.

19 April
A Rwandan Air Force Antonov An-8, TL-ACM, chartered from Centrafrican Airlines, crashed near Pepa, Democratic Republic of the Congo after engine failure caused by a suspected bird strike. All 24 on board were killed.

=== June ===
19 June
A United States Navy F-14A Tomcat of Fleet Replacement Squadron 101 VF-101 crashed during tactical demonstration at NAS JRB Willow Grove, killing the pilot and Radar Intercept Officer.

=== July ===
26 July
A Royal Jordanian Air Force C-130H Hercules, 348, crashed shortly after takeoff from King Hussein Air Base, Mafraq Governorate, Jordan. Due to mechanical failures which resulted in the death of all 13 crew members on board.

=== August ===
25 August
Royal Air Force BAE Systems Hawk T.1, XX266, of the Red Arrows demonstration team suffered a birdstrike while returning to Exeter from a display at Dartmouth, Devon, ~17 miles (27 km.) SW of Exeter, punching large hole in starboard wing. The aircraft was landed safely at Exeter Airport.

=== September ===
28 September
A US Navy Beechcraft T-34C Turbo-Mentor of VT-10 crashed in a hayfield in Baldwin County near Silverhill, Alabama, killing both crew.

=== October ===
25 October
A Russian Air Force Ilyushin Il-18 crashed near Batumi, Georgia during landing in low-visibility, killing all 84 people on board.

=== November ===
1 November
Hellenic Air Force LTV A-7H Corsair II, 159666, of the 345th Mira, crashed near Cape Tainaros, Crete, Greece. The pilot survived.

16 November
Indian Air Force Mil Mi-8 crashed near Rann of Kutch, killing all 12 people on board.

=== December ===
11 December
The 18th Bell-Boeing MV-22B Osprey, BuNo 165440, of VMMT-204 (US Marine Corps), with only 157.7 flight hours, crashed in a remote wooded area ~10 miles from MCAS New River, Jacksonville, North Carolina, killing all four crew members.

== 2001 ==
=== January ===
19 January
A Turkish Air Force CASA CN-235 crashed near Kayseri after entering a spin from which recovery was not possible, killing all 3 people on board
27 January
The second Antonov An-70 prototype crashed seconds after departure from Omsk airport following multiple engine failure. All 33 on board survived.

=== February ===
16 February
A Royal New Zealand Air Force Douglas A-4K Skyhawk, NZ6211, from No. 2 Squadron RNZAF crashed near HMAS Albatross in New South Wales while practicing maneuvers for an upcoming air show, killing the aircraft's pilot.

=== March ===
3 March
A United States National Guard Short C-23B+ Sherpa (Shorts 360), 93-1336, of Florida Army National Guard Det. 1, H Company, 171st Aviation Regiment, based at Lakeland Linder International Airport, crashed during heavy rainstorm around 1100 hrs. in Unadilla, Georgia in the United States. All 21 people on board were killed. Aircraft was en route from Hurlburt Field, Florida to NAS Oceana, Virginia with Virginia Beach-based RED HORSE detachment on board who had been training at Hurlburt.

23 March
A German Air Force Panavia Tornado IDS of Jagdbombergeschwader 34 crashed 180 kilometres (110 mi) northwest of Nellis Air Force Base, Nevada, United States, in the Nevada Test and Training Range, during a low-level attack at night which was being flown as part of Exercise Red Flag. The pilot and the weapon systems officer, both of Jagdbombergeschwader 33, were killed in the crash.

=== April ===
1 April
A US Navy Lockheed EP-3E Aries II surveillance aircraft, BuNo 156511, coded 'PR-32', of VQ-1, collided with a Chinese Shenyang J-8IID fighter jet, reported as 81192, and was forced to make an emergency landing at Lingshui air base on Hainan Island, China. The U.S. crew was detained for 10 days; the Chinese fighter pilot, Wang Wei, was reported missing and presumed dead. The Chinese refused to let the Orion be flown out, so it was dismantled and transported on chartered Antonov An-124-100 of Polyot.

4 April
A Sudan Air Force Antonov An-24 crashed during a sandstorm in Adar Yeil, Sudan. Of the 30 people on board, 14 were killed; among them, Sudan's deputy defense minister as well as other high-ranking officers.

12 April
A Magyar Légierő (Hungarian Air Force) Mil Mi-24D, 579, collided with Mil Mi-24V, 715, while performing low-level formation flight over the range near Gyulafirátót, killing the crew of 579. Aircrew of 715 sustained serious injuries but survived.

=== May ===
16 May
A Turkish Air Force CASA CN-235M-100 crashed into a field in Malatya, Turkey killing all 34 on board.

17 May
A Fokker F-27 Friendship of the Argentine Air Force crashed near El Plumerillo Airport in Mendoza Province. The 5 crew members died on impact. It is believed the cause of the accident was a malfunction in one of the engines that caused it to catch on fire.

18 May
A Turkish Navy CASA CN-235 on a test flight crashed after the pilot lost control after reaching an altitude of just 100 feet, killing all 4 people on board.
25 May
A Swiss Air Force Aérospatiale Alouette III crashed near Delsberg, Canton of Jura, after a collision with a cable, killing the Pilot and three cross guardians

29 May
The three crewmembers of a Republic of Korea Army Boeing Vertol CH-47D Chinook helicopter, of the 301st Aviation Regiment, Icheon, were killed when the aircraft crashed in Seoul, South Korea while installing a flame-shaped sculpture atop the Han River Olympic Bridge, built to commemorate the 1988 Olympic Games. Having just lowered the sculpture onto the top of the bridge's central tower the Chinook's forward rotor clipped the apex of the flame and then the tower. The rotor separated from the airframe, which immediately fell onto the span of the bridge and broke in two, the rear half bursting into flame on the bridge and the forward half falling into the river. The bridge had been closed in view of the installation work, and no casualties besides the crew were reported. The dead were identified as pilot Chun Hong-yop, co-pilot Nam In-ho and Sgt. 1st Class Kim Woo-soo. The accident was captured in close detail on video, which subsequently has become widely circulated via the World Wide Web. Following the accident army scuba divers were deployed to recover the wreckage.

29 May
A US Navy McDonnell-Douglas F/A-18 crashed near Fort Pierce, Florida, during a ferry flight from NAS Oceana, Virginia, to NAS Key West, Florida. The pilot was killed.

=== July ===
17 July
At pilot Maj. Aaron George of the 416th Flight Test Squadron at Edwards Air Force Base, California, and Judson Brohmer of Tehachapi, California, an aerial photographer under contract to the Air Force Flight Test Center, were killed in the crash of an Edwards-based Lockheed Martin F-16B Block 5 Fighting Falcon, 78-0100, while on a test sortie to chase and film the launch of the Miniature Air-Launched Decoy (MALD) from a second F-16, also from the 416th Flight Test Squadron.

=== October ===
12 October
A Swiss Air Force Aérospatiale Alouette III helicopter crashed after colliding with an elevated cable near the alpine village of Crans-Montana, Canton of Valais, killing all four of the craft's occupants. it was the second cable-collision crash involving a Swiss Air Force aircraft to have occurred within a five-month period.

=== December ===
1 December
A Russian military Ilyushin Il-76TD caught fire and crashed near Novaya Inya, Russia, killing all 18 on board.

== 2002 ==
=== January ===
8 January
A Belgian Air Force General Dynamics F-16A crashed during approach at Kleine Brogel Air Base. The pilot ejected safely.

9 January
A USMC Lockheed KC-130R, BuNo 160021 of VMGR-352 (RAIDR 04) crashed into mountainous terrain while on a nighttime approach to Shamsi, Pakistan, 270 kilometers southwest of Quetta, Pakistan, killing all seven crew members on board.

=== February ===
17 February
A USMC McDonnell-Douglas F/A-18D Hornet from VMFA-533 crash-landed at Twentynine Palms, California. Both aircrew ejected but the WSO, while hospitalized, died from his injuries.

21 February
A Russian Navy Antonov An-26, 07 Red, crashed one mile (1.5 km.) short of runway at Lakhta Airfield, near Arkhangelsk, northern Russia, during an emergency landing. Of the 20 people on board, 17 were killed.

=== March ===
2 March
A Grumman F-14B Tomcat, BuNo 162923, of VF-143, 'AG', from the carrier USS John F. Kennedy crashed into the Mediterranean near the Greek island of Crete, killing its pilot. The aircraft was launching from the carrier when the nose gear disintegrated – both crew ejected but the pilot was outside the envelope and was killed.

8 March
A Grumman F-14A Tomcat, BuNo 158618, of VF-211, based at NAS Oceana, Virginia Beach, Virginia crashed into the Arabian Sea after a failed attempt to land on the carrier USS John C. Stennis. The Navy said both crew members were pulled from the water by a rescue helicopter shortly after the accident; neither appeared to be seriously injured.

9 March
A Portuguese Air Force Lockheed Martin F-16 Fighting Falcon crashed in Monte Real, Portugal while practicing aerobatic maneuvers, killing the pilot.

=== April ===
2 April
A United States Navy Sikorsky MH-53E Sea Dragon of HM-14 BuNo 163051 crashed on the runway at Bahrain International Airport. All 18 men and woman on board survived with only a few cases of minor injuries.

11 April
A MiG-27 fighter jet of the Indian Air Force crashed into the village jungles of South Indian state in Karnataka after flying from Goa Air Force Station, Karwar, killing the pilot, Flying Officer Prashant Kumar Mishra.

20 April
During the NAS Point Mugu air show (Point Mugu, California), the pilot and radar intercept officer were killed when their United States Navy McDonnell-Douglas QF-4S+ Phantom II, BuNo 155749, stalled and crashed after pulling away from a diamond formation. Both ejected but their chutes had insufficient time to deploy. The Navy report stated in part: "The cause of this tragic accident was the failure of the pilot to manage the energy state of the aircraft, and then to recognize a departure from controlled flight at low altitude, and apply the NATOPS recovery techniques." This Phantom II was credited with a MiG-17 kill 10 May 1972 with VF-96.

24 April
A Belgian Air Force General Dynamics F-16B collided with an Ikarus C42 (regn PH-3G8) at Sellingen. The pilots of the F-16 and the Ikarus C42 were killed. The pilot in the backseat of the F-16 ejected and survived.

30 April
A McDonnell Douglas F-15C Eagle, 80-0022, of the 40th Flight Test Squadron, 46th Test Wing, based at Eglin Air Force Base, Florida, crashed in the Gulf of Mexico ~60 miles S of Panama City, Florida, while on a captive flight development test of a new air-to-air missile, killing test pilot Maj. James A. Duricy, assigned to the 40th Test Squadron, 46th Test Wing. His body was never recovered. An Accident Investigation Board determined that the crash was caused by the structural failure of the honeycomb material supporting the leading edge of the port vertical stabilizer during a high-speed test dive. A section of the leading edge, approximately 6 X 3 feet, broke away. "The doomed F-15C was flying at 24,000 feet when part of its tail broke off. Maj. James A. Duricy ejected at 900 mph and was killed. Investigators said the tail had corroded over the years. The fighter had gotten old." A static display F-15 formerly assigned to the 46th Test Wing, was dedicated to Major Duricy at Arnold Air Force Base, Tennessee, on 9 August 2007.

=== May ===
3 May
An Indian Air Force Mikoyan-Gurevich MiG-21 pilot ejected after takeoff, the aircraft subsequently crashing into a Jalandhar bank building, killing eight on the ground.

12 May
The hangar housing Buran OK-1K1 in Kazakhstan collapsed, due to poor maintenance. The collapse killed eight workers and destroyed the orbiter as well as a mock-up of an Energia carrier rocket.

=== June ===
2 June
An Angolan Armed Forces Mil Mi-17 helicopter crashed in poor weather killing 20 of the 25 on board. Among those on board were top military officials who were going to attend a disarmament ceremony by UNITA rebels.

=== July ===
Crash of Desert Duck 744

5 July
U.S. Navy Sikorsky UH-3H Sea King, Desert Duck 744, operated by HC-2, Detachment 2, based out of Bahrain, suffered tail rotor failure while landing aboard the USS Cushing, spun out of control, went over the starboard side. Seven on board escaped safely.

27 July
A Ukrainian Air Force Sukhoi Su-27UB crashed during the Lviv airshow, killing 77 spectators, 28 of them children. 199 were injured. The two pilots managed to eject, but the aircraft crashed onto spectators watching the airshow from the ground. The aircraft lacked the altitude to escape the crash, hit the tribune and fell on the ground. As stated by Ukrainian Defense Ministry, the crash was caused because of engine failure. The pilots & unit commanders were later jailed.

=== August ===
7 August
A USAF Lockheed MC-130H aircraft, 90-0161 (C/n. 5265), flying from Rafael Hernandez Airport in Aguadilla, Puerto Rico, crashed in Caguas, Puerto Rico, killing the ten crew members. While on a training mission flying at low level in bad weather, the aircraft descended below a safe altitude and impacted a mountain at Caguas.

19 August
A Russian Air Force Mil Mi-26 helicopter was shot down by Chechen rebels using a portable SAM, probably an Igla, in Khankala, Russia. Of the 152 on board, 118 were killed.

=== September ===
10 September
United States Navy Lockheed S-3B Viking, BuNo 159402, from VS-22 and based aboard USS Harry S Truman, crashed into the sea at night 25 miles south-east of Puerto Rico. The aircraft's three crew-members were killed.

=== October ===
3 October
United States Navy Grumman F-14A-135-GR Tomcat, BuNo 162594, c/n 516, coded AD 136, of VF-101, suffered dual compressor stalls, causing both engines to shut down, during a routine training flight, crashing in the Gulf of Mexico on mission out of NAS Key West, Florida. The pilot and the instructor ejected safely at 5,000 feet (1,500 m) and were rescued with only minor injuries by a Sikorsky UH-3 Sea King helicopter. On 5 May 2006, one of this Tomcat's tail-fins was discovered on an isolated beach W of Cork, Ireland, having floated 4,900 miles (7,900 km.) across the Atlantic. This was the sixteenth and last Tomcat lost by VF-101 during 30 years of operation.

18 October
Two Boeing F/A-18F Super Hornets collided during air combat manoeuvring off the Southern California coast and crashed into the Pacific Ocean 80 mi SW of Monterey, California. All four crew (two Pilots and two WSOs) were killed while flying (KWF).

=== November ===
3 November
A McDonnell-Douglas F/A-18C Hornet from VFA-34 failed to return to USS George Washington from a night at sea bombing mission and crashed into Adriatic Sea. Pilot was killed.

12 November
A Swiss Air Force PC-7 crashed at Bonaduz after a collision with a cable from the Rhäzuns-Feldis funicular, causing the death of both pilots.

== 2003 ==
=== January ===
6 January
A US Navy F/A-18 Hornet hit an arresting gear box and skidded off the runway at NAS Lemoore, while conducting Field Carrier Landing Practice during a period of heavy fog due resulting in extremely low visibility.
17 January
A US Marine Corps McDonnell-Douglas F/A-18D Hornet crashed into the Pacific Ocean off of MCAS Miramar, California, due to a material failure during a functional check flight with one engine shut down. Both crewmembers ejected safely and were recovered.

=== February ===
19 February
An Islamic Revolutionary Guard Corps Ilyushin Il-76MD, 15-2280, c/n 0063471155, formerly registered YI-AND, crashed into a mountain in poor weather near Shahdad, Iran. All 18 crew and 284 passengers on board were killed.

20 February
A Pakistan Air Force Fokker F-27-200, 10254, of 12 Squadron, crashes near Kohat, Pakistan when it strikes a ridge at the 3,000-foot (910 m) level (915 m) AMSL, obscured by clouds. All 17 people on board died, including Air Chief Marshal Mushaf Ali Mir. PAF spokespersons said on 22 May that pilot error was to blame.

27 February
A Canadian Armed Forces Sikorsky CH-124B Sea King helicopter, 12401, of 12 Wing, crashed on the deck of HMCS Iroquois in the Persian Gulf. No-one was killed, but the ship's mission in the Gulf was postponed.

=== March ===
22 March
During the 2003 invasion of Iraq, two Royal Navy Westland Sea King ASaC.7 Airborne early warning (AEW) helicopters, registration XV650, 'CU-182', and XV704, 'R-186', collided in mid-air five miles (8 km) from their aircraft carrier HMS Ark Royal while one had been leaving on a mission as the other returned from the same operation. One American exchange pilot on board, a former E-2C Hawkeye pilot formerly from Carrier Airborne Early Warning Squadron One One Five, was killed. It was later revealed that the three main contributory factors noted by the Board of Inquiry coincided with the three main areas of degradation between the older AEW Mk2 and the upgraded ASaC Mk7; all three factors had been identified and mitigation put in hand, but two were cancelled by an unauthorised official and the other rejected by the RN.

22 March
A RAF Tornado GR4 ZG710 was shot down by a US Patriot Missile Battery, killing both crew. It later emerged that the primary cause (failure to properly integrate IFF) had been identified in 1998 but corrective action rejected.

=== May ===
1 May
A Boeing C-32B or Boeing 757-23A, wearing what may or may not have been a U.S. Air Force serial number, 00-9001, c/n 25494/611, and assigned to the 486th Flight Test Squadron, which is known to be an Eglin Air Force Base, Florida, unit, suffered a ~0300 hrs. landing accident at North Auxiliary Airfield, South Carolina, when the nose gear collapsed due to a heavy landing. Thought to be operated by the United States State Department (a standard deflection for the Central Intelligence Agency and their Special Operations Group (SOG) / Special Activities Division (SAD) in support of Foreign Emergency Support Team (FEST) activities). Air Force spokeswoman Major Linda Pepin said that there were no serious injuries: "There was a crew of 10 on board. Two sustained minor injuries and were treated and released." The nose gear on the plane collapsed and the plane's position on the ground was not parallel to the runway. Major Pepin stated that the incident would be investigated in days to come by an Air Force safety board: "In any case where there's an incident that involves aircraft safety to ensure that whatever happened in this incident we can avoid next time." Pepin said that they could not foretell know how long the aircraft would stay on the runway: "It's really too early to know when it will get it up and moving." North Auxiliary Airfield is used for C-17 Globemaster III training.

26 May
A Canadian Armed Forces CF-18 crashed north of CFB Cold Lake during a training exercise. The pilot, who ejected, was killed.

=== August ===
18 August
A Polish Air Force Sukhoi Su-22M-4K of 8th Tactical Squadron was flying within the Wicko Morskie range, near Ustka, as a part of anti-aircraft artillery exercises when it was shot down at 1600 hrs by a 2K12 Kub missile. Another account ascribes the downing merely to a "technical malfunction". The pilot, Lt. Col. Andrzej Andrzejewski, safely ejected and landed in the Baltic Sea 21 km (11 nmi (20 km; 13 mi)) from the coast and was picked up by a Mil Mi-14PS SAR helicopter from Siemirowice Air Base approximately 90 minutes later. Andrzejewski was later killed in the 2008 Polish Air Force C-295 crash.

=== September ===
11 September
While landing aboard USS George Washington, operating off the Virginia Capes, a McDonnell-Douglas F/A-18D-32-MC Hornet (Lot 13), BuNo 164198, c/n 961/DO63, 'AD 432', of VFA-106, went off the angle at ~1600 hrs. when the arresting cable snapped; the pilot ejected and was recovered. The broken cable, whipping back across the deck, injured eleven deck crew, the most seriously of whom were airlifted to shore medical facilities. Footage: https://www.youtube.com/watch?v=7OxMox2Kdxs

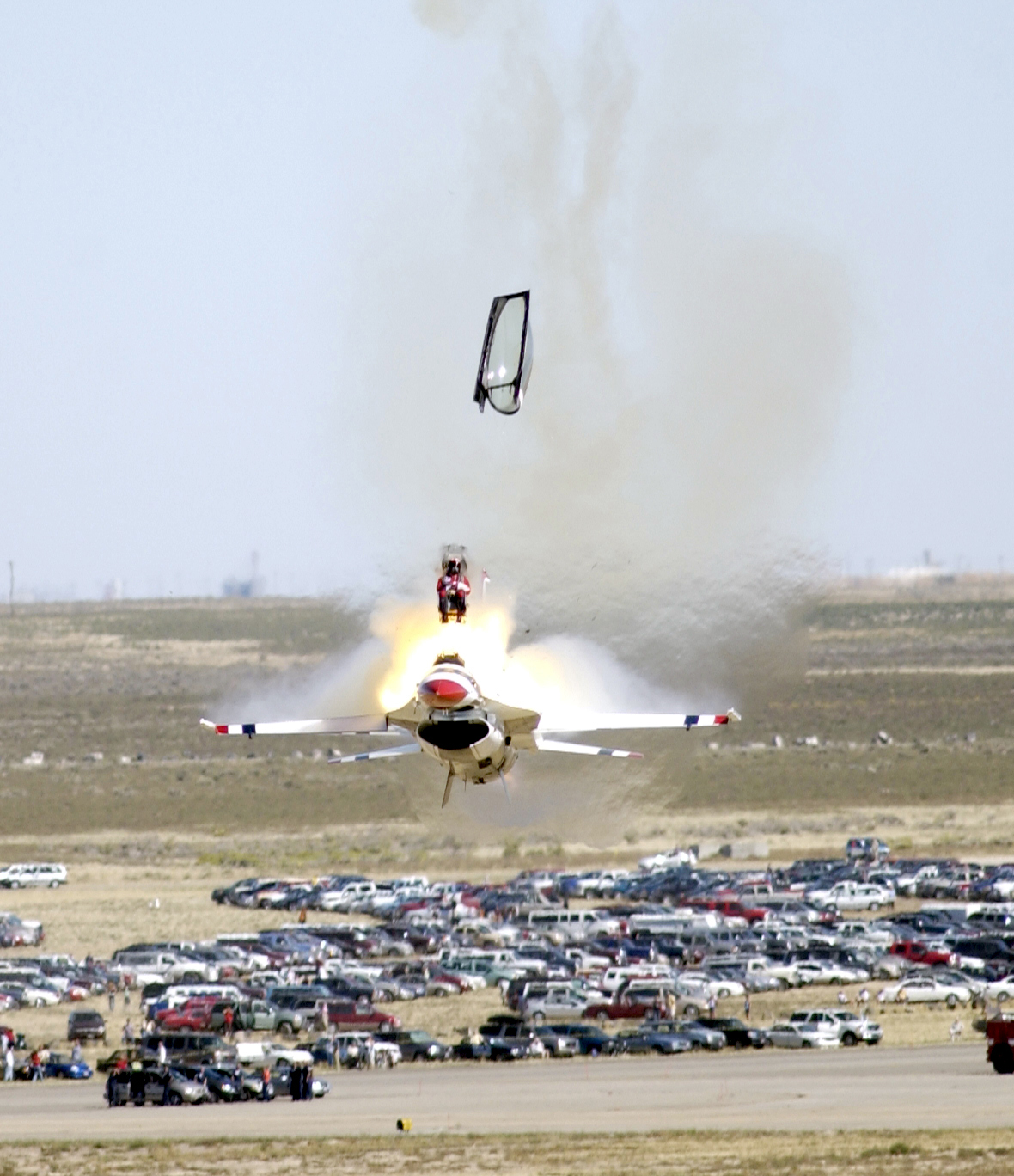
Captain Chris Stricklin ejects from his F-16 at an air show in September 2003.

14 September
Opposing Solo Pilot, Capt. Chris R. Stricklin, in Thunderbirds Number 6, a Lockheed Martin F-16C Block 32J Fighting Falcon, 87-0327, misjudged his altitude before beginning a Split-S takeoff maneuver at Mountain Home AFB, Idaho, ejected in ACES II seat 8/10ths of a second before the aircraft impacted the runway. Stricklin survived with no injuries.

18 September
A Tupolev Tu-160, bort number '01', of the 121st regiment, 22 heavy bombers division, on a proving flight out of Engels Air Base after the replacement of one of its four engines, crashed near Stepnoye settlement, Sovetskoye, Saratov oblast, killing the four crew. There were no armaments aboard. Just before the crash the crew reported an engine fire to ground control, after which contact with the pilots was lost. The wreckage of the bomber was found 35 km from its base. No injuries occurred on the ground. The main staff of the air force identified the dead as crew commander, Lt. Col. Yuriy Deyneko, co-pilot Maj. Oleg Fedusenko [the Russian TV channel gave this name as Fedunenko in its 1000 GMT newscast], and the navigators as Maj. Grigoriy Kolchin and Maj. Sergey Sukhorukov. This was the first Blackjack loss in 17 years of operations.

=== November ===
15 November
Two US Army Sikorsky UH-60 Black Hawk helicopters collided near Mosul, Iraq. Seventeen out of the total of 22 soldiers aboard the two craft were killed.

29 November
An Air Force of the Democratic Republic of the Congo Antonov An-26, 9T-TAD, blew out a tire while landing in Boende, Democratic Republic of the Congo, overran the runway and crashed into a market square. Of the 24 people on board, 20 were killed and 13 people on the ground died.

=== December ===
9 December
Two Belgian Air Force General Dynamics F-16A collided near Havelange. One pilot ejected safely, the other was killed.

== 2004 ==
=== February ===
26 February
Macedonia Government Beechcraft 200 Super King Air, Z3-BAB, c/n BB-652, crashed into mountains while attempting to land in poor weather at Mostar International Airport, Bosnia – Herzegovina. All 9 aboard were killed, including Macedonian President Boris Trajkovski. The probable cause was attributed to pilot error - the two-man crew misinterpreted crucial flight data in stormy weather.

=== March ===
10 March
U.S. Marine Corps Cessna UC-35D 165938 crashed near Interstate 15 on approach to MCAS Miramar, California, during a training flight and burned out, killing all four marines on board.

16 March
A U.S. Air Force Beechcraft 1900 crashed on approach to Tonopah Test Range Airport after the pilot suffered a heart attack. All five aboard were killed.

23 March
First prototype Boeing X-50A Dragonfly Canard Rotor/Wing crashed at the United States Army Yuma Proving Ground, Yuma, Arizona, during its third hover test flight. It had made its first flight on 4 December 2003.

24 March
US Navy McDonnell-Douglas F/A-18C Hornet, of VFA-82, crashed into the Atlantic Ocean near Tybee Island, Georgia. The pilot ejected safely and was rescued.

=== June ===
21 June
Grumman F-14A Tomcat of the Islamic Republic of Iran Air Force, flown by Capt. Darioush Yavari and Col. Ali Abou Ataa, crashed on approach to Shahid Beheshti Air Base when Yavari, an experienced Northrop F-5 pilot qualifying on the F-14, misjudged his sink rate during a no-flaps landing, undercarriage and struck the runway with enough force to flip the Tomcat onto its back, killing both crew. The probable cause was determined to be a premature rush to put the pilot in the cockpit without his having completed his flight-simulator course. The commanding officer of TFB.8, Gen. Ahmad Mieghani (himself a former F-5 pilot) resigned, but the investigative commission reinstated him, recognizing the true source of the problem.

=== July ===
21 July
Two US Marine Corps McDonnell-Douglas F/A-18 Hornets of VMFA-134, 3rd Marine Air Wing, based at MCAS Miramar, California, suffered a mid-air collision over the Columbia River, 120 miles (190 km) E of Portland, Oregon, shortly after 1430 hrs., killing Marine Reservists Maj. Gary R. Fullerton, 36, of Spartanburg, South Carolina, and Capt. Jeffrey L. Ross, 36, of Old Hickory, Tennessee in F/A-18B, BuNo 162870, 'MF-00', coming down in the river. Maj. Craig Barden, 38, ejected from F/A-18A, BuNo 163097, 'MF-04', landed nearby on a hillside W of Arlington, Oregon and was taken to Mid-Columbia Medical Center in The Dalles, suffering minor injuries. All three crew ejected but only two parachutes opened. The fighters were on their way to the Boardman Air Force Range, where the Oregon Air National Guard trains, when they collided, said one spokesman. Another spokesman told the Associated Press that the aircraft were on a low-altitude training exercise.

=== August ===
15 August
A US Marine Corps CH-53D Sea Stallion lost tail rotor authority on approach to MCAS Futenma on the island of Okinawa. This was due to improper maintenance. The failure to install a cotter pin resulted in vibrations forcing loose a bolt, thus causing separation of the tail boom from the aircraft. The aircraft proceeded to spin out of control striking a college building before hitting the ground and catching fire. The post maintenance test flight crew of 3 survived the crash with injuries.

21 August
A Venezuelan Air Force Shorts 360 crashed near Maracay, Venezuela, killing all 30 on board.

=== September ===
9 September
A low-flying British Army Westland Lynx AH.9 helicopter, ZE382, of 661 Squadron AAC, 1st Regiment, Army Air Corps, was caught in high-voltage electric wires during an Anglo-Czech joint military training exercise near the village Kuroslepy (near Brno). All six persons on board died.

11 September
A Hellenic Army Boeing-Vertol CH-47SD Chinook, EZ-916, of 4 TEAS, ditched into the Aegean Sea off Mount Athos, Greece around 1056 hrs. killing all 17 on board. Among those killed was Patriarch Peter VII of Alexandria.

14 September
A US Navy McDonnell-Douglas F/A-18C Hornet of VMFA-212 crashed at Manbulloo Station about 10 M SW of RAAF Tindal, Australia, during a day approach to landing. The pilot ejected and was injured.

16 September
A Mikoyan-Gurevich MiG-19 belonging to the Albanian Air Force, crashed shortly after taking-off from Tirana International Airport Nënë Tereza on an exercise flight. The sole pilot onboard perished.

21 September
A U.S. Army UH-60 Black Hawk crashed on Tallil Air Base in Southern Iraq. All four crew members sustained injuries and were rescued by firefighters from the 407th Air Expeditionary Group and medical personnel from the 407 Expeditionary Medical Squadron.

=== November ===
9 November
A U.S. Navy McDonnell-Douglas F/A-18C Hornet crashed 15 miles E of Nellis AFB, Nevada, due to an in-flight fire and becoming uncontrollable shortly after takeoff. The pilot ejected safely.

26 November
United States Marine Corps Bell-Boeing MV-22B Osprey, BuNo 165838, lost a 20 × 4 inch piece of a prop-rotor blade during test flight in Nova Scotia, Canada, but was able to make safe precautionary landing at CFB Shearwater despite severe airframe vibration. The blade failed after apparently being hit by ice which broke off from another part of the aircraft.

29 November
A U.S. Army Sikorsky UH-60L Black Hawk, crashed shortly after taking off from Fort Hood, Texas, when it struck guy-wires supporting the television antenna of KXXV, near Waco, Texas, killing all seven soldiers aboard. Conditions were foggy and the warning lights on the tower were not lit, in violation of both Federal Communications Commission (FCC) and Federal Aviation Administration (FAA) regulations. Victims included Brigadier General Charles B. Allen of Lawton, Oklahoma; Specialist Richard L. Brown of Stonewall, Louisiana; Chief Warrant Officer Todd T. Christmas of Wagon Mound, New Mexico; Chief Warrant Officer Doug Clapp of Greensboro, North Carolina; Chief Warrant Officer Mark W. Evans of Killeen, Texas; Chief Warrant Officer David H. Garner of Mason City, Iowa; and Colonel James M. Moore of Peabody, Massachusetts.

=== December ===
2 December
The pilot of a Blue Angels McDonnell-Douglas F/A-18 Hornet, BuNo 161956, ejected approximately one mile off Perdido Key, Florida, after reporting mechanical problems and loss of power. Lt. Ted Steelman suffered minor injuries and fully recovered.

10 December
Two Canadian Armed Forces Canadair CT-114 Tutor trainers of 431 Snowbirds Air Demonstration Team, 114064 and 114173, flying as opposing solo '8' and '9' (unclear which was which), collided at the top of a loop during practice over Mossbank Airfield, an abandoned World War II aerodrome. Captain Miles Selby, pilot of '8' was killed instantly, but Captain Chuck Mallet was thrown clear of the wreckage of '9', released his lap belt and pulled his chute release, landing with minor injuries.

An FMA IA-63 Pampa trainer aircraft of the Argentine Air Force crashed near the runway of Base Aeronaval Punta Indio near La Plata, Buenos Aires Province. The sole pilot died in the accident. The aircraft was performing an exhibition flight for a group of Chinese entrepreneurs.

20 December
Lockheed Martin F-22 Raptor, 00-4014, c/n 4014, tailcode 'OT', of the 422d Test and Evaluation Squadron, crashed on takeoff at Nellis Air Force Base, Nevada, prompting the U.S. Air Force to ground most of its other F-22s. The pilot ejected safely from the Lockheed Martin-built jet, which smashed into the runway it was trying to leave at about 1545 hrs. local time and burned.

== 2005 ==
=== January ===
18 January
During a training flight, a United States Air Force Cessna T-37B, 66-8003, Cider 21, of the 89th Flying Training Squadron, 80th Flying Training Wing collided in midair with a civilian Air Tractor AT-502B, registration number N8526M, on a cross-country ferry flight over unpopulated ranch land near Hollister, Oklahoma, USA. Both aircraft spiralled out of control. The T-37's two crew-members ejected, one suffering minor injuries, while the pilot and sole occupant of N8526M was killed. Both aircraft were operating under visual flight rules (VFR) at an altitude of 5,000 ft (1,520 m) at ~1128 hrs. in conditions reported as hazy and overcast; the AT-502B pilot had not established radio contact with air traffic control, and his aircraft was not equipped with a transponder, but neither was required for VFR operation in Class [Category] E airspace. The crash was primarily attributed to the failure of the pilots to "see and avoid" conflicting air traffic during VFR flight. Investigators concluded that the aircraft collided at an angle of approximately 100 degrees, and a USAF Aerospace Physiologist determined that the AT-502B's left roll cage/door structure created a blind spot that occluded the T-37B from the AT-502B's pilot's line of sight, but the T-37B's right canopy bow did not produce a blind spot for the T-37B pilots. Contributing factors included the lack of a transponder and radios on the AT-502B and the reduced visibility due to haze. Additionally, the USAF report notes that the AT-502B was flying at an inappropriate altitude for its compass heading, as visual flight rules called for cruise flight at an odd or even altitude plus 500 ft (152 m); however, given the pilot's high level of VFR experience, USAF investigators surmised that he was transitioning to a proper altitude at the time, but this hypothesis could not be confirmed. This accident is a rare example of a midair collision in daylight VFR conditions during cruise flight distant from an airport.

26 January
A United States Marine Corps Sikorsky CH-53E Super Stallion helicopter ferrying troops crashed during a sandstorm near Ar Rutba, Iraq killing all 31 on board.

29 January
A Boeing F/A-18 Super Hornet crashed into the ocean while landing on USS Kitty Hawk (CV 63). The No. 3 arresting wire snapped, resulting in the aircraft plunging into the Pacific Ocean 100 miles SE of Yokosuka, Japan, hitting an SH-60F and an EA-6B Prowler en route to the water. Crew LTJG Jon Vanbragt, LCDR Markus Gudmundsson ejected safely.

31 January
A Colombian government Sikorsky UH-60 Black Hawk helicopter on an anti-narcotics mission crashed in heavy fog near Manguipayan, Colombia killing all 20 on board.

=== March ===
31 March
A Lockheed MC-130H Combat Talon II, USAF 87-0127, c/n 5118, Wrath 11, of the 7th Special Operations Squadron, 352d Special Operations Group, RAF Mildenhall, departed Tirana-Rinas Airport, Albania, for a night training mission to work on terrain-following and avoidance skills, airdrops and landing using night-vision goggles. Flying 300 feet (91 m) above mountainous terrain, the airplane had insufficient altitude to clear a ridge and stalled as the crew attempted to climb away. The aircraft was destroyed on striking the ridge, and all nine crew members on board were killed.

=== April ===
2 April
A Royal Australian Navy Westland Sea King Mk.50a, N16-100, '(9)02', helicopter Shark 02 of 817 Squadron RAN crashed on the Indonesian island of Nias while providing humanitarian support following the 2005 Nias–Simeulue earthquake, killing 9 Australian Defence Force personnel on board.

18 April
A United States Air Force Lockheed Martin F-16DJ Block 50D Fighting Falcon, 91-0469, c/n CD-24, of the 55th Fighter Squadron, 20th Fighter Wing, based at Shaw AFB, South Carolina, crashed in a marsh next to the Ashley River near Charleston, South Carolina, 5 NM SE of Charleston AFB. The two crew members, Maj. Steve Granger and Lt. Col. Maurice Salcedo, both assigned to Ninth Air Force Stan Eval and flying with the 55th Fighter Squadron ejected safely. Both the main power and backup power failed moments before the crash, the pilot said.

=== July ===
18 July
A Boeing F/A-18E Super Hornet and a Boeing F/A-18F Super Hornet from NAS Lemoore, California, collided over the China Lake, California, weapons testing ground. The pilot of the E was killed while flying, while the two crew of F ejected with injuries.

=== August ===
15 August
A US Navy Grumman C-2A Greyhound, BuNo 162178, c/n 58, of VAW-120, made a successful belly landing at Chambers Field, Naval Air Station Norfolk, Virginia, after its undercarriage refused to extend. The aircraft had departed Norfolk for NAS Pensacola, Florida, when problems were detected. It circled for two hours to burn fuel before landing safely. None of the 25 onboard was injured. The airframe was struck off evaluated with Class A damage, as damaged beyond repair.

=== September ===
5 September
Sukhoi Su-33 landing on the Russian aircraft carrier Admiral Kuznetsov at 16 27 hrs. engaged the landing trap, but its arresting wire snapped and the fighter went off the deck into the North Atlantic, pilot Sub Colonel Yuri Korneev ejecting immediately. The jet sank in ~1,000 metres of water; the pilot deployed the raft from his survival pack and was rescued by a Kamov Ka-27P rescue helicopter, and brought on board in a "normal condition." According to a source in Naval Headquarters, "it is possible that the pilot also made a mistake during the incident. The jet pilot, according to instructions, should have revved the engine after the cable broke and performed an emergency take-off. However, the fault of the pilot can be determined only after analysis from the Su-33’s black box," reported Kommersant. Capt. Of First Rank Igor Dygalo, head of the press center of the Main Staff of the Navy, said that the black box released as it was designed and surfaced after the aircraft sank. This was the first loss of the type during a "sea flight."

9 September
A Belgian Air Force General Dynamics/SABCA F-16A Block 20 MLU Fighting Falcon, FA-112, ex-87-0056, c/n 6H-112, of 1 Squadron, 2 Wing, crashed at the Vliehors Shooting Range. The pilot, Cdt. Fabrice Massaux, did not eject and was KWF. The Belgian four-ship formation was practising strafe runs over the Vliehors range in the Netherlands when one of the F-16s crashed at around 1055 hrs. local. The pilot was part of the 1st Squadron, based at Florennes AB in Belgium. His body was found shortly after the crash by Dutch rescue crews. The Belgian Ministry of Defense sent a team of specialists to the accident scene by Sea King helicopter to investigate the cause of the crash. A bird strike was the suspected cause.

15 September
Russian Air Force Sukhoi Su-27 Flanker of the 6th Air Force, 177th Fighter Regiment, during a flight between St. Petersburg and Kaliningrad, for unknown reasons veered off its course while travelling over neutral waters of the Baltic Sea, entered Lithuanian airspace and crashed in Jurbarkas region, Lithuania. No one was harmed during the incident, and pilot Maj. Velery Troyanov ejected safely.

=== December ===
6 December
An Islamic Republic of Iran Air Force Lockheed C-130E Hercules, 5-8519, crashed into an apartment building in Tehran, Iran. Ninety-four people on board were killed as well as 14 in the building.

== 2006 ==
=== January ===
3 January
A United States Army Sikorsky Aircraft UH-60 Black Hawk helicopter crashed near Tal Afar, Ninawa Governorate, Iraq. The aircraft, part of a two-Black Hawk helicopter team, was travelling between military bases when the accident occurred, resulting in 12 fatalities.

10 January
A US Navy North American T-39 Sabreliner of VT-86, en route from Chattanooga, Tennessee to NAS Pensacola, Florida, on a low-level navigation training mission, failed to arrive at ≈1500 hrs. as expected. The wreckage was found late 11 January near LaFayette, Georgia. All four personnel on board, a Navy instructor, a Navy student, an Air Force student and a civilian contract pilot, were killed. Their identities were not immediately released.

19 January
A Slovak Air Force Antonov An-24 carrying peace-keepers from Kosovo crashed near Telkibánya, Hungary. Of the 43 people on board, only one survived.

28 January
An F/A-18 Hornet attempting a night landing aboard the USS Ronald Reagan (CVN-76) crashed into the flight deck and skidded off into the ocean about 200 kilometres south-east of Brisbane, Australia. The pilot ejected safely and was rescued from sea, but the $37 million aircraft was lost.

=== March ===
9 March
A Learjert 35 of the Argentine Air Force crashed shortly after taking off from El Alto airport near La Paz, Bolivia. The 5 crew members died on the crash. The aircraft had been on a humanitarian mission carrying medical supplies to Bolivia.

=== April ===
3 April
A USAF Lockheed C-5B Galaxy, 84-0059, of 436th Airlift Wing/512th Airlift Wing AF Reserve, crashed in a field one mile (1.6 km) short of the runway during landing approach to Dover AFB, Delaware. All 17 on board survived, although three were seriously injured. The cause was found to be aircrew error as the pilots and flight engineers did not properly configure, maneuver and power the aircraft during approach and landing.

10 April

A Kenya Air Force Harbin Y-12 crashed in Marsabit County in Kenya as it approached Marsabit air strip killing 14 occupants, including a number of politicians.

=== May ===
5 May
During the Children's Day flight exhibition at Suwon Air Base, South Korea, Capt. Kim Do-hyun of the Republic of Korea Air Force's Black Eagle team was killed when he lost control of his Cessna A-37B Dragonfly.

23 May
A Greek Lockheed Martin F-16C Block 52 Fighting Falcon, 56-0514, c/n 182–3122, of 343 Mira, and Turkish TAI F-16C Block 40 Fighting Falcon, 93-0684, c/n HC-28, of 192 Filo, based at Balikesir, but which took off from Dalaman, collided at ~1300 hrs. local (0600 hrs. ET) over the Aegean Sea as two Greek F-16s intercepted a pair of Turkish F-16s escorting an RF-4E Phantom II recce aircraft towards Crete after an alleged airspace violation. After the intercept, the fighters manoeuvered in a mock dogfight, but two collided ~12 miles off the coast of the Greek island of Karpathos. The collision was witnessed by an EgyptAir flight that was passing by. The Greek pilot, Flight Lieutenant Konstantinos Iliakis, was presumed dead, but the Turkish pilot, 1st Lieutenant Halil Ibrahim Özdemir, was rescued by a freighter under Panamanian flag, but refused to board a Greek SAR helicopter. Greek Super Puma and Turkish Cougar SAR helicopters were dispatched to the area.

=== June ===
3 June
A People's Liberation Army Air Force converted KJ-200 (converted from Shaanxi Y-8), Y-8F-600, AWACS crashed in Guangde County in the People's Republic of China. All 40 people on board died.

26 June
U.S. Navy VFA-122 squadron pilot Brian R. Deforge, 25, died when his McDonnell-Douglas F/A-18 Hornet collided with another over Fort Hunter Liggett, north of San Luis Obispo, California. The other pilot successfully ejected and survived.

=== July ===
6 July
Israel Air Force F-16I tail 489 crashed while taking off from an IDF base in the Negev desert due to a tyre bursting. The crew ejected safely.

13 July
A Royal Air Force BAE/McDonnell Douglas Harrier II GR.9 crashed after the pilot ejected near Kidlington in Oxfordshire in the United Kingdom.

16 July
A Bell 222/230 helicopter belonging to the Albanian Air Force flying from Tirana to Bari, Italy, lost contact with air traffic control over the Adriatic Sea. On board the helicopter was Gramoz Pashko, an ex-member of the Albanian Parliament who was being transported to Italy for specialized medical care after he had hit his head while diving in the sea previously during the day, leaving him in a coma. He was accompanied by his son, a doctor and three crew members. The cause of the accident could never be determined as the wreckage of the helicopter was never recovered.

=== September ===
2 September
A Royal Air Force Hawker-Siddeley Nimrod MR.2 reconnaissance aircraft, XV230, crashed near Kandahar, Afghanistan after a fire and explosion caused by a fuel leak. All 14 crew on board were killed.

14 September
A US Air Force Lockheed Martin F-16CJ/D Block 50B Fighting Falcon, 91-0337, of the 22d Fighter Squadron, 52d Fighter Wing, based out of Spangdahlem Air Base, Germany, crashed in the nearby village of Oberkail after a landing gear failure prevents it from making a controlled landing. The pilot, 1st Lt. Trevor Merrell, ejected safely after aiming his aircraft towards a vacant cow pasture, where it crashed, causing no injuries.

17 September
A Nigerian Air Force Dornier 228 crashed killing fifteen, including many senior officers.

=== October ===
24 October
A Royal Air Force Tornado GR4 from RAF Marham in Norfolk, eastern England, crashed at around 1100 GMT during a routine practice training exercise at RAF Holbeach Bombing Range located in Lincolnshire. The aircraft wreckage scattered across tidal mud flats located on The Wash bombing range. Both airmen ejected from the aircraft and were rescued by two scrambled RAF Westland Sea King helicopters from Wattisham Airfield and RAF Leconfield. The pilot and navigator were flown to Queen Elizabeth Hospital in King's Lynn, their condition was not thought to be life-threatening, but were being assessed as standard procedure and whether or not there had been any stress to their Vertebral column. Bird strike was thought at the time of the incident to have caused the crash, resulting in the aircraft's sudden engine failure.

=== November ===
29 November
Two members of the Australian Army were killed and seven are injured when a Sikorsky S-70A-9 Black Hawk helicopter, A25-221, of 171 Aviation Squadron, hit the deck of HMAS Kanimbla and crashed off Fiji.

=== December ===
16 December
A Mexican Air Force Antonov An-32B, 3103, of 3 Grupo Aero/EATP 301, crashed into the sea off the coast of Mexico, near Acapulco. The four crew members on board were killed.

18 December
The Lockheed Martin Polecat UAV aircraft crashed due to an "irreversible unintentional failure in the flight termination ground equipment, which caused the aircraft's automatic fail-safe flight termination mode to activate", cited by Lockheed Martin.

== 2007 ==
=== January ===
24 January
Ecuadorian Defence Minister Guadalupe Larriva, her 17-year-old daughter and five army officers were killed when two Aérospatiale SA.342L Gazelle military helicopters, EE-343 and EE-360, of Grupo Aéreo 43, collided near Manta Air Base at 2019 hrs. during night training.

=== February ===
2 February
A HAL Dhruv helicopter, part of the Sarang display team, lost altitude and crashed while practicing for Aero India-2007 at the Yelahanka Air Base near Bangalore, India. The pilot was severely injured, and the co-pilot was killed. The Saarang team continue their planned performance for the airshow.

18 February
A United States Army Boeing-Vertol MH-47E Chinook, 92-00472, of 2-160th Special Operations Aviation Regiment, crashed in southeastern Afghanistan due to a sudden, unexplained loss of power and control killing eight and wounding 14.

=== April ===
4 April
Heavy rain caused the crash of a Força Aérea Brasileira EMBRAER Super Tucano near Boa Vista International Airport, the pilot, Fernando Wilmers de Medeiros, did not survive. 3 other Super Tucanos from the same squad were able to make an emergency landing.

12 April
An unarmed Panavia Tornado ECR of the German Air Force crashed into a rock face 46.550328°N 7.923805°E near Lauterbrunnen, Switzerland, killing the pilot. The weapons system officer ejected and was rescued from the rock face, severely injured, by a local helicopter rescue team. The crash occurred minutes after refueling in Emmen during an authorized navigation training in the Swiss Alps while returning to Germany from a long-distance flight to Corsica, France.

21 April
A United States Navy Blue Angels McDonnell-Douglas F/A-18 Hornet, BuNo 162437, crashed into a residential neighborhood while performing at an airshow in Beaufort, South Carolina, in the United States, killing the pilot. Military investigators blamed the pilot for his fatal crash. A report obtained by The Associated Press said that Lieutenant Commander Kevin Davis got disoriented and crashed after not properly tensing his abdominal muscles to counter the gravitational forces of a high-speed turn.

27 April
A Russian military Mil Mi-8 transport helicopter crashed near Shatoy, Chechnya in Russia. The incident occurred during the Battle of Shatoy and killed the crew and 17 spetsnaz (Russian special forces) soldiers on board.

=== May ===
1 May
A Dassault Mirage III of the Fuerza Aérea Argentina (Argentine Air Force) crashed at 1110 hrs. at Morón Air Base after making a low pass during a "baptism of fire" day celebration, observing the opening of combat in the 1982 Falklands/Malvinas War. The pilot, Lt. Marcos Peretti, apparently encountered a fogbank after making the pass. He did not eject after steering the aircraft away from populated areas and was killed. Defence Minister Nilda Garré, who presided over the main celebration, ordered all Mirage aircraft grounded until a full investigation into the accident had been completed. "The causes of the accident are under investigation", said minister Garré adding that "Mirages are grounded until we determine how the accident happened; the pilot was in contact until a minute before the accident".
6 May
A French Air Force de Havilland Canada DHC-6 Twin Otter transporting Multinational Force and Observers crashed into a truck while making an emergency landing near El-Thamad, Egypt killing all nine people on board.

11 May
A Republic of China Air Force Northrop F-5 crashed onto a building at an army base in Hukou, Hsinchu, Taiwan. The two crew members were killed, as well as two soldiers of the Singapore Army undergoing training at the base. Another nine Singapore Army soldiers were injured, one dying of his injuries 17 days later.

24 May
A Fuerza Aérea del Perú (Peruvian Air Force) de Havilland Canada DHC-6-300 Twin Otter, FAP-303, c/n 483, crashed in dense jungle after taking off from Pampa Hermosa, Peru. Of the 20 people on board, 13 were killed.

=== June ===
13 June
A Mongolian People's Army Mil Mi-8 helicopter crashed in Selenge Province, Mongolia while en route to a forest fire killing 15 of the 22 people on board.

=== July ===
30 July
FA-18C from VFA-195 crashed after the pilot inadvertently ejected while on emergency night approach to USS Kitty Hawk (CV 63). The aircraft continued to fly for nearly 20 minutes before crashing into the sea 400 miles SE of Guam. The pilot was safely recovered.

=== August ===
5 August
An Air Wing of the Armed Forces of Malta Scottish Aviation Bulldog AS0020 stalled and crashed in Dwejra, Gozo. The stalling was probably a result of a sudden microburst. The aircraft cartwheeled upon impact, and hit its nose, wing and tail before coming to a stop upside down. The cockpit slid open and the plane's engine got dislodged upon impact. The cartwheel led to a loss of momentum which probably saved the crew's lives. The two crew members, Mark Brincat and Kevin Borg, had minor injuries only and were treated for shock at St. Luke's Hospital after being airlifted.

8 August
A Royal Air Force Aérospatiale-Westland Puma HC.1, ZA934, 'BZ', of 33 Squadron, crashed in a wooded area of Hudswell Grange, W of Catterick Garrison, North Yorkshire, UK. Two RAF crew, pilot and aircraft commander Flt. Lt. David Oxer Hanson Sale, and crewman Sgt. Phillip Anthony "Taff" Burfoot died in the crash, while Army Pvt. Sean Tait, Royal Regiment of Scotland, died two days later in hospital. Nine others were injured but survived.

15 August
Lts. Ryan Betton, Cameron Hall and Jerry Smith were killed when their Grumman E-2C Hawkeye, BuNo 163696, 'AD', from Carrier Airborne Early Warning Squadron 120 (VAW-120), based at the Naval Station Norfolk, Virginia, crashed in the Atlantic Ocean off North Carolina at ~2300 hrs. An investigation was unable to determine the cause of the crash, according to a copy of the Judge Advocate General final report – known as a JAGMAN – obtained by Navy Times. The aircraft catapulted off the deck of the carrier USS Harry S. Truman and crashed into the water moments later. The carrier never received any emergency radio transmissions or acknowledgment by the mishap crew, according to the report.

30 August
A Boeing B-52H Stratofortress, accidentally loaded with six W80-1 nuclear-armed AGM-129 advanced cruise missiles flew from Minot Air Force Base, North Dakota, to Barksdale AFB in Louisiana, where the unguarded aircraft sat on the tarmac for 10 hours undetected. Officers responsible for the security lapse at Minot were disciplined.

=== September ===
7 September
A Sikorsky MH-53M Pave Low IV, 69-05794, of the 20th Special Operations Squadron, Hurlburt Field, crashed near Duke Field, Eglin Auxiliary Field 3; two were injured.

=== November ===
7 November
A Romanian Air Force IAR-330 Puma SOCAT crashed in Argeș County, Romania, killing all three crew members on board.

8 November
A US Army UH-60 Black Hawk, operating from Aviano Air Base, Italy, crashed at 1217 hrs. near the Piave River, killing all seven on board, a mixed crew of Army and Air Force personnel. KWF are Air Force Capt. Cartize Durnham, Staff Sgt. Robert Rogers, Staff Sgt. Mark Spence, Senior Airman Kenneth Hauprich, Army Capt. Christian Skoglund and Chief Warrant Officer Two Davidangelo Alvarez. One year later, on the anniversary of the accident, members of the Aviano Air Base and Santa Lucia di Piave communities joined to unveil a special memorial honoring those U.S. military members who died in the crash and to remember those Italian World War I heroes of Piave.

=== December ===
6 December
A French Air Force twin-seat Dassault Rafale aircraft with a single occupant, on a training flight from the Saint-Dizier base, crashed in an uninhabited part of the Neuvic parish in the Corrèze area, with the loss of its pilot.

== 2008 ==
=== January ===
6 January
A Boeing F/A-18E Super Hornet was involved in a mid-air collision with a Boeing F/A-18F Super Hornet over the North Persian Gulf during routine ops from the USS Harry S Truman. One pilot ejected and was recovered.

12 January
A Macedonian Mil Mi-17 transport, VAM-304, crashed near Skopje, Republic of Macedonia, killing all 11 soldiers on board.

15 January
A Lockheed Martin F-16C Block 30J Fighting Falcon, 87-0347, of the 482nd Fighter Wing, Air Force Reserve Command, based at Homestead Air Reserve Base, Florida, crashed in the Gulf of Mexico near Key West at ~1930 hrs. during a training mission. The pilot, Major Peter S. Smith, ejected and was recovered by a U. S. Navy helicopter, transported to a local hospital for examination, and released. A board of officers was appointed to investigate the accident.

22 January
A Pakistan Air Force Cessna T-37 Tweet trainer encountered a mechanical failure during the first solo flight of Pilot Officer Raja Jahanzeb, flying over Topi, Pakistan. Declining ejection orders to prevent loss of life on the ground, he chose to crash land the plane on a campus road of GIK Institute merely avoiding faculty buildings and blew up into pieces on crashing. The crash killed the pilot and a gardener. Raja Jahanzeb was posthumously awarded Tamgha-e-Basalat (Medal of Good Conduct).

23 January
A Polish military airplane EADS CASA C-295, '019', c/n S-043, crashed in forested area near Polish city Miroslawiec killing all 20 people aboard – 16 Polish Air Force officers (including one general, Gen. Andrzej Andrzejewski, who previously survived an ejection from a Su-22M-4K on 18 August 2003, and six colonels) and 4 crew members.

28 January
A Portuguese Air Force Lockheed Martin F-16B Block 20 MLU Fighting Falcon, 83-1171, crashed in Monte Real, Portugal while performing a test run after going through extensive maintenance. The pilot, Lt. Col. João 'Skipper' Pereira, safely ejected.

=== February ===
1 February
A United States Air Force McDonnell Douglas F-15 Eagle from the 199th Fighter Squadron, 154th Wing of the Hawaii Air National Guard flying on a routine training flight crashed into the Pacific Ocean near Oahu, Hawaii. After losing control at low altitude simulating air-to-air combat the pilot ejected about 60 miles (97 km) south of the Honolulu International Airport and was rescued by a United States Coast Guard helicopter.

13 February
A USMC BAe-McDonnell-Douglas AV-8B Harrier II from VMA-542 crashed at the Open Ground Farms in Carteret County, North Carolina after pilot Capt Ian E. Stephenson failed to readjust his engine nozzles from the hover-stop position, making the aircraft incapable of staying in the air. He was able to safely eject.

20 February
Two McDonnell-Douglas F-15C Eagles of the 58th Fighter Squadron, 33d Fighter Wing, Eglin AFB, Florida, collide over the Gulf of Mexico ~50 miles (80 km) S of Tyndall AFB, Florida, killing 1st Lt. Ali Jivanjee. Capt. Tucker Hamilton ejected from the other fighter and survived. Airframes involved were F-15C-26-MC, 79-0075, c/n 0624/C144, and F-15C-32-MC, 81-0043, c/n 0793/C226. Both pilots ejected and one was rescued from the Gulf by the fishing boat Niña, owned by Bart Niquet of Lynn Haven, Florida, which was guided to the pilot by an HC-144A Ocean Sentry aircraft. A 1st SOW AC-130H and an MV-22 Osprey were also diverted to the scene to help search as were five Coast Guard aircraft and two vessels. An HH-60 Jayhawk from Coast Guard Aviation Training Center Mobile lifted the pilot from the fishing boat and evacuated him to the Eglin Hospital. The second pilot was rescued from the Gulf by an HH-60 Jayhawk from CGAS Clearwater and also taken to the Eglin Hospital. One pilot subsequently died several hours later from his injuries. An accident investigation released 25 August 2008 found that the accident was the result of pilot error and not mechanical failure. Both pilots failed to clear their flight paths and anticipate their impending high-aspect, midair impact, according to Brig. Gen. Joseph Reynes Jr., Air Combat Command's inspector general who led the investigation. This was the first crash involving an Eglin F-15 since a fatal crash on 30 April 2002.

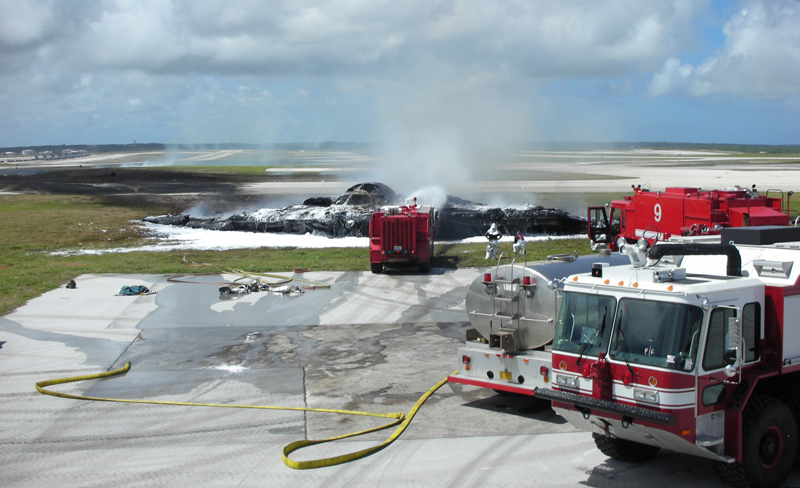
89-0127, Guam

23 February
A Northrop-Grumman B-2A Spirit, 89-0127, 'WM', "Spirit of Kansas", of the 393rd Bomb Squadron, 509th Bomb Wing, Whiteman AFB, Missouri, crashed shortly after takeoff from Andersen Air Force Base in Guam. Both pilots ejected from the aircraft before it crashed; the aircraft was destroyed. Moisture in flight sensors caused steep pitch-up and stall to port.

=== March ===
3 March
An Iraqi Air Force Mil Mi-17 helicopter crashed in a dust storm near Baiji, Iraq, killing seven members of the IAF, as well as SSgt. Christopher S. Frost, 24, of Waukesha, Wisconsin, a USAF public affairs specialist who deployed to the Multinational Security Transition Command-Iraq from the 377th Air Base Wing at Kirtland AFB, New Mexico.

7 March
Failure of a brake metering valve caused a Rockwell B-1B Lancer bomber of the 28th Bomb Wing to roll forward into two rescue vehicles after engine shutdown at Andersen AFB, Guam. Damage to the B-1B and the two vehicles totaled $5.8 million. The "Bone" had stopped over at Andersen while transiting home to Ellsworth AFB, South Dakota from the Singapore Air Show and had taken off for home but returned after the crew declared an in-flight emergency. The aircraft stopped at designated spot off the runway to be met by emergency apparatus, but rolled into the vehicles unexpectedly.

14 March
A Lockheed Martin F-16C Block 25D Fighting Falcon, 84-1273, flown by pilot 2nd Lt. David J. Mitchell, 26, of Amherst, Ohio, crashed during training mission in a remote area three miles (5 km) S of Alamo Lake, Arizona. His body was located in a ravine near the aircraft wreckage. Mitchell, of the Ohio Air National Guard's 180th Fighter Wing at Toledo Express Airport, Swanton, Ohio, was assigned to the 62d Fighter Squadron at Luke AFB, Arizona since November 2007 as a student pilot. He had 237 total flying hours, ~26 in the F-16.

=== April ===
4 April
A USAF Rockwell B-1B Lancer, 86-0116, of the 28th Bomb Wing, suffered hydraulic failure while taxiing after landing at Al Udeid Air Base, Qatar, veering off the runway and catching fire. Four crew evacuated safely but the airframe was burnt out after the bomb load exploded.

8 April
An Antonov An-26 aircraft on a training mission, possibly belonging to Vietnam's 918 Air Transport Regiment, crashed into a field in Thanh Tri District, Hanoi, Vietnam, killing five military pilots. It had taken off from Gia Lam Airport, and crashed on its way back. The cause of the accident is unknown.

=== May ===
21 May
A Serbian Air Force single-seat SOKO J-22 Orao ground attack aircraft flown by Major Tomas Janik crashed near the village of Baranda. The aircraft that crashed was wearing serial 25114 and was operational with the 241 Fighter-Bomber Aviation Squadron, of 98th Air Base Lađevci. The flight went well until 1130 hours local time when pilot Major Janik experienced problems with his aircraft and was forced to eject. The aircraft went down in the vicinity of the village Baranda and was completely destroyed.

=== June ===
13 June
Two United States Navy jets collided over the NAS Fallon, Nevada high desert training range, killing a pilot of the McDonnell-Douglas F/A-18C Hornet, based at NAS Oceana, Virginia. Two crew aboard the F-5 Tiger ejected safely and were rescued.

=== July ===
8 July
Three Airmen of the 319th Special Operations Squadron, 1st Special Operations Wing, avoided serious injury when the leased Pilatus PC-12 in which they were training crashed at the end of the runway at Hurlburt Field, Florida, Eglin Auxiliary Field 9, at ~2330 hrs. as they attempted a landing. The initial investigation finds that the turboprop encountered wake turbulence from another aircraft that had landed shortly before the accident. As a precaution, the three crew were taken to the Eglin hospital and released the same afternoon. Hurlburt leases the PC-12 to train Airmen for the U-28A, the Air Force's version of the single-engine utility aircraft, used in combat for intra-theatre support for the special operations forces.

21 July
A U.S. Air Force Boeing B-52H Stratofortress, 60-0053, "Louisiana Fire", crashed into the Pacific Ocean approximately 25 nautical miles (46 km) northwest of Apra Harbor, Guam, after taking off from Andersen Air Force Base. The aircraft was about to participate in a flyover for the Liberation Day parade in Hagåtña when it crashed at 9:45 AM ChST (2345 UTC), 15 minutes before the parade was scheduled to start. There were no survivors.

30 July
A U.S. Air Force McDonnell-Douglas F-15D Eagle, 85-0131, crashed on the Nevada Test and Training Range ~50 miles (80 km) E of Goldfield, Nevada, at ~1130 hrs. The F-15D, of the 65th Aggressor Squadron, 57th Aggressor Training Group, Nellis Air Force Base, was participating in a combat training mission as part of Exercise Red Flag 08–03. Air Force officials identified the pilot who died as Lt. Col. Thomas A. Bouley, commander of the 65th AS at Nellis. A United Kingdom Royal Air Force Tornado F.3 pilot assigned to the USAF's 64th AGRS was with him and was taken to Mike O'Callaghan Federal Hospital at Nellis. The pilot arrived ~1330 hrs. Wednesday, the Air Force said. The pilot was in stable condition and under observation. The Royal Air Force pilot's name was withheld while the investigation into the crash continues.

=== August ===
25 August
A Philippine Air Force C130 Hercules transport plane, with two pilots and seven crewmembers on board, crashed into Davao Gulf after takeoff from Francisco Bangoy International Airport. There were no survivors.

=== September ===
24 September
A Serbian Air Force SOKO G-4 Super Galeb basic trainer/light attack jet aircraft with serial number 23736 flown by Lt. Colonel Ištvan Kanas crashed at Batajnica Air Base. Ištvan Kanas (aged 43), pilot of Flight Test Section (Sektor za letna ispitivanja – SLI) did not survive the crash. Kanas was a top Serbian test pilot and member of the private aerobatics team and former member of Leteće Zvezde aerobatics team, officials say he was practicing for an upcoming Belgrade 2008 airshow. He was a father of two. This is the second G-4 Super Galeb ever to crash with tragic consequences after 21 years.

=== October ===
1 October
Two Aéronavale Dassault Super Etendards collided in mid-air and crashed into the English Channel off northeastern France. One pilot remained missing.

9 October
A Canadian Armed Forces Canadair CT-114 Tutor crashed into farmland just northwest of CFB Moose Jaw while taking photographs of a formation of Canadian Forces training aircraft, both crew killed.

17 October
The Russian Air Force grounded all its Mikoyan MiG-29s following a crash in Siberia on this date. The fighter came down 60 kilometers (37 mi) from the Domna airfield during a regular training flight. The pilot ejected safely.

20 October
A Republic of China Air Force AIDC F-CK-1B Ching-kuo fighter crashed into the Taiwan Strait during a low-level bombing exercise. Two pilots were declared missing.

21 October
A Republic of China Navy Sikorsky S-70C crashed five miles off the eastern coast of Hualien County. Of the five persons on board one was killed and two were declared missing.

23 October
An Aeronautica Militare Sikorsky HH-3F Pelican helicopter crashed in southern France. The eight persons on board were killed.

=== December ===
5 December
A Mikoyan-Gurevich MiG-29 crashed at Chita in the district of Zabaykalsky Krai, Siberia at 0612 hrs. Moscow time, killing the pilot.

8 December
A USMC McDonnell-Douglas F/A-18D Hornet, BuNo 164017, crashed into a San Diego neighborhood, University City, coming down two miles (3 km) west of MCAS Miramar, California, just after the Marine pilot, Lieutenant Dan Neubauer, from VMFAT-101, ejected. Four fatalities on the ground resulted. The Hornet was being flown from the USS Abraham Lincoln. The commander of the fighter squadron involved in the crash, its top maintenance officer and two others were relieved of duty as a result of the crash investigation. The pilot was grounded pending a further review, Maj. Gen. Randolph Alles announced in March 2009.

== 2009 ==
=== January ===
12 January
A Sikorsky UH-60L Blackhawk, 91-26321, of the 36th Combat Aviation Brigade, Texas Army National Guard, crashed on the campus at Texas A&M University just after take-off due to tail rotor failure, killing 2nd Lt. Zachary Cook - a 2008 Texas A&M graduate and member of the Texas A&M ROTC and Aggie Corps of Cadets - and injuring four other Army personnel. The helicopter was participating in the Rudder's Rangers Annual Winter Field Training.

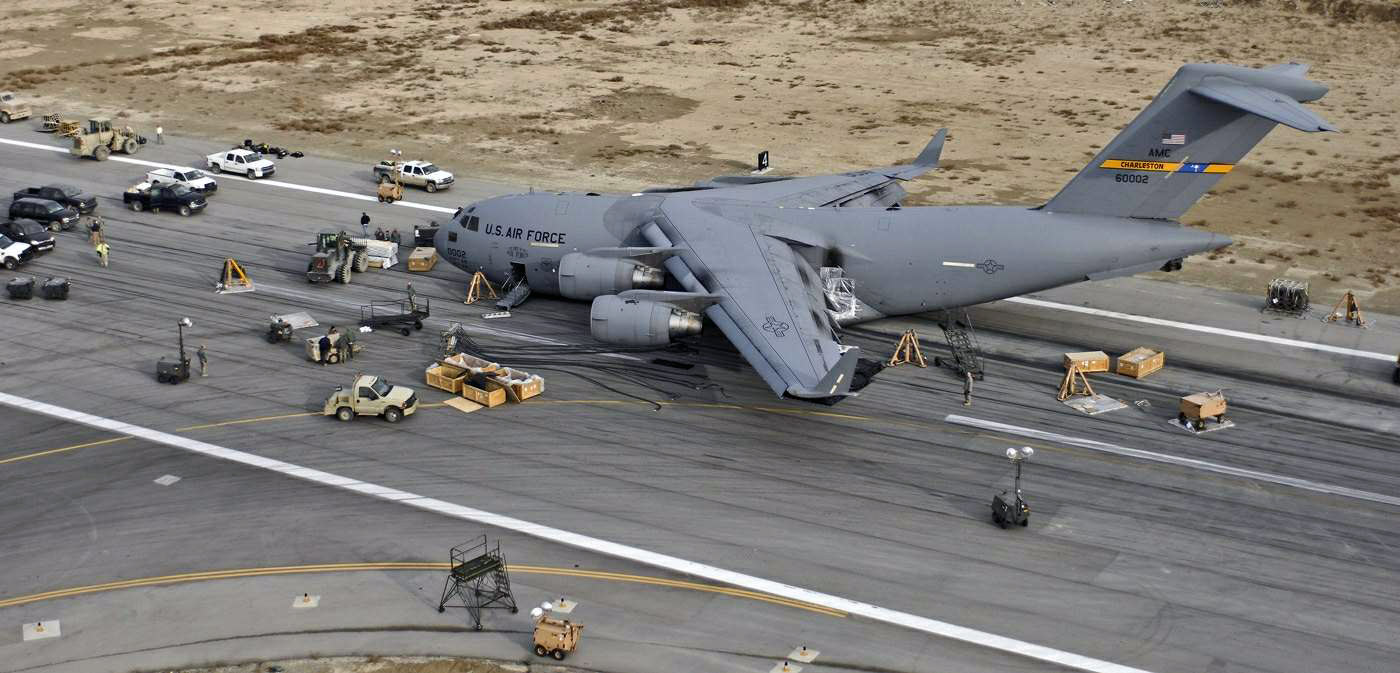
C-17A Globemaster III, 06-0002, "Spirit of the Air Force", on Bagram Air Base runway after inadvertent night belly-landing in January 2009.

15 January
An Afghan National Army Air Corps Mil Mi-17 Hip Helicopter crashed in Herat Province in western Afghanistan. The incident occurred in bad weather and travelling at low-altitude in a mountainous region resulting in 13 fatalities including the Afghan General Fazaludin Sayar.

17 January
A French Army Eurocopter AS 532 Cougar Helicopter crashed into the Atlantic Ocean off of the coast of Gabon. The helicopter on a routine exercise was flying from the amphibious assault ship the FS Foudre and the accident occurred shortly after take-off resulting in 2 injured and 8 fatalities from the 13e Régiment de Dragons Parachutistes and the Aviation Légère de l'Armée de Terre.

20 January
Two Spanish Air Force Dassault Mirage F1 on a training flight, collided in midair. The three pilots were found dead in the debris of the airplanes.

21 January
An Indian Air Force HAL HJT-16 Kiran Mk.2 military trainer aircraft from the No. 52 Squadron Surya Kiran (Sun Rays) Aerobatics display team based at the Bidar Air Force Station in Karnataka, India crashed into a field during a routine training exercise, killing the pilot.

26 January
A United States Army routine night exercise involving two Bell OH-58 Kiowa Helicopter from the 6th Cavalry Regiment based at Fort Drum, New York, collided in midair. The accident occurred near the city of Kirkuk Northern Iraq resulting in 4 crew fatalities.

30 January
The pilots of a Boeing C-17A Globemaster III, 06-0002, "Spirit of the Air Force", of the 16th Airlift Squadron, 437th Airlift Wing, Charleston AFB, South Carolina, distracted by a series of minor problems, neglected to lower the landing gear and belly-landed the transport in at Bagram Air Base, Afghanistan after dark. None of the six crew aboard was injured, but damages of $19 million were sustained by the airframe. The pilots were grounded pending a command review of the accident, an Air Mobility Command spokesman said. The automated ground proximity warning system was apparently accidentally turned off. This is the first belly-landing of a C-17 in sixteen years of operation.

=== February ===
9 February
A leased Pilatus U-28A, 06-0692, with three personnel of the 319th Special Operations Squadron, 1st Special Operations Wing on board, based at Hurlburt Field, Florida, made a gear-up landing at Craig Field (Alabama) at Selma, Alabama (formerly Craig Air Force Base) whilst performing simulated engine failure approach, breaking off the nosewheel and causing severe damage to the nosewheel strut assembly, propeller and main undercarriage doors. A board of officers will investigate the 1415 hrs. incident in which there were no injuries. This accident has been classified as a Class A accident, indicating that fairly substantial damage was incurred. Aircraft repaired and reported flying again by 29 April 2009.

9 February
A Royal Air Force BAE Systems Harrier T.10 (ZH656) on a routine training exercise from No. 20 Squadron (R) Operational conversion unit based at RAF Wittering crashed on the runway at Royal Air Force Station Akrotiri, Cyprus. The 2 crew members ejected safely from the aircraft which was damaged in its post-crash fire.

11 February
Two Grob G 115 Tutor aircraft collided above Porthcawl, South Wales killing four people. The aircraft took off from RAF St Athan shortly before. Among the dead were two female teenage cousins and two instructor pilots.

18 February
A Fuerza Aérea Colombiana Basler BT-67 (Colombian Air force designation: AC-47T) intelligence-gathering aircraft of the Escuadrón de Combate Táctico 113 Avion Fantasma (ghost aircraft) crashed near the Comando Aéreo de Combate No 1 Airbase at Puerto Salgar, Cundinamarca, Colombia. The aircraft was on a training flight resulting in 5 crew fatalities.

27 February
A Polish Army Mil Mi-24 Hind Helicopter crashed in bad weather into a forest near Toruń, Kuyavian-Pomeranian Province, Poland. The aircraft from the 49 Regiment combat helicopters Pruszcz Gdański was on a night training flight for service in Afghanistan resulting in 2 crew injured and 1 fatality.

=== March ===
19 March
An Aviación del Ejército Ecuatoriana (Ecuadorian Army Aviation) Beechcraft military aircraft crashed into an apartment building in Quito, Ecuador, killing five on board and two on the ground.

23 March
A German Air Force Panavia Tornado, 45+37, from Jagdbombergeschwader 33 crashed on the runway at Büchel Air Force Base, Rhineland-Palatinate, Germany. The aircraft, on a routine night training exercise, suffered extensive damage during the incident which occurred in high winds and rain. The two crew members ejected safely.

25 March
A USAF Lockheed Martin F-22A Raptor, 91-4008, Raptor 07, of the 411th Flight Test Squadron, 412th Test Wing, crashed in the marshy flat land 6 miles N of Harper Dry Lake near Edwards Air Force Base, California, during a weapons integration flight test mission. The single-seater went down about 1000 hrs. (1300 hrs. ET) for unknown reasons, the officials said. The fighter was on a test mission when it crashed about 35 miles (56 km) NE of Edwards AFB, where it was stationed, the Air Force said in a news release. David Cooley, 49, a 21-year Air Force veteran who joined Lockheed Martin Corp., the aircraft's principal contractor, in 2003. Cooley, of Palmdale, was killed while flying and pronounced dead at Victor Valley Community Hospital in Victorville, California. An Air Force investigation finds that the accident occurred after the pilot lost consciousness in a high-gravity maneuver. The reports stated that during the third test of the mission the pilot appeared to have been subjected to increased physiological stress and his lack of awareness delayed a recovery maneuver. At 7,486 ft MSL, the pilot initiated ejection outside of the seat design envelope and immediately sustained fatal injuries.

31 March
A Polish Air Force PZL M28 (Antonov An-28TD Bryza 1TD) crashed into trees on final approach to an airfield near Gdynia, Poland, killing its crew of four. The aircraft was a routine training flight simulating a one-engine landing.

=== April ===
2 April
A Spanish Air Force F/A-18 Hornet crashed in northern Spain. The pilot ejected safely.

6 April
An Indonesian Air Force Fokker F27 crashed in Bandung, Indonesia killing all 24 occupants on board. The cause of the incident was said to be heavy rain. The aircraft reportedly crashed into a hangar during its landing procedure and killed all on board. The casualties include: 6 crew, an instructor and 17 special forces trainee personnel.

7 April
A Philippine Air Force Bell 412 helicopter crashed in bad weather in a heavily forested area at Mount Mangingihe, Sitio Tawangan, Kabayan, Benguet, Philippines. The helicopter was travelling from Loakan Airport to Ifugao in the Cordillera Administrative Region in Luzon when it crashed killing the 3 crew and 5 government officials.

10 April
A Kenyan Airforce Harbin Y-12 crashed into a hillside on approaching an airstrip near Marsabit, Eastern Province, Kenya killing 14 personnel.

14 April
A Turkish Air Force Lockheed Martin F-16C Fighting Falcon from the 9th Air Wing flying from Balıkesir Airport on a routine night exercise crashed near the village of Muradiye Sarnıç, Balıkesir Province, Turkey killing the pilot.

26 April
The third flying prototype of the Sukhoi Su-35, 04 (?), was destroyed during a high-speed taxi test just before its first flight at Dzemgi Airport near Komsomolsk-on-Amur. Aircraft apparently ran off end of runway, hits obstacle, burns, destroying it. Test pilot Eugene Frolov ejected safely and was unhurt. This was actually the fourth prototype, but 03 served purely for ground testing.

30 April
An Indian Air Force Sukhoi Su-30MKI crashed in the Pokhran region of Rajasthan after it took off from Pune during its routine sortie, killing one of its two pilots. This was the first crash of the Su-30MKI since its induction in the IAF.

=== May ===
3 May
A Venezuelan Army Mil Mi-17 Hip helicopter crashed on a border patrol with Colombia with 17 fatalities including the Venezuelan General Domingo Faneite. The accident occurred near the town of El Alto de Rubio, in Táchira state, Venezuela.

4 May
A Russian Navy Kamov Kamov Ka-27 (Helix) Helicopter landing on the Baltic Fleet Frigate Yaroslav Mudryi, the main-rotor made contact with the ship superstructure, crashed on the deck and then rolled over the side into the sea. The 5 crew from the Kamov helicopter were successfully rescued from the sea.

5 May
A United States Marine Corps Bell AH-1W SuperCobra belonging to HMM-166, based at MCAS Miramar, California, crashed at 1154 hrs. PST into the Cleveland National Forest, California, killing both pilots.

12 May
A South African Air Force Agusta Westland AW109E, helicopter, 4022, crashed at the Woodstock Dam, near Bergville, KwaZulu-Natal, South Africa. The aircraft from No. 17 Squadron SAAF was travelling from Durban International Airport to a satellite base of the 87 Helicopter Flying School SAAF at Dragon's Peak, Drakensberg for a week-long training exercise. Flying with two another aircraft at low level and at high speed over the surface of the Dam, the helicopter struck the water and crashed, then sinking into the lake and killing the 3 crew.

14 May
A Royal Air Force BAE Systems Harrier GR9 (ZG478) from No. 1 Squadron based at RAF Cottesmore made a heavy landing at Kandahar International Airport, Afghanistan due to an engine failure, forcing the pilot to successfully eject from the aircraft.

15 May
An Indian Air Force Mikoyan MiG-27 Flogger crashed shortly after take-off and the pilot successfully ejected from the aircraft. The accident occurred near the Konkani village, Jodhpur, India and resulted in injuries to 7 local villagers.

15 May
A Fuerza Aérea Colombiana Dassault Mirage 5COAM (FAC-3031) on a routine training flight from the Comando Aéreo de Combate No. 1, crashed shortly after take-off from the Palanquero airbase, Puerto Salgar, Cundinamarca Department, Colombia. The aircraft from the Escuadrón de Combate 112 suffered a technical fault, causing a fire which forced the pilot to eject from the aircraft, without him incurring injury.

19 May
A United States Navy Sikorsky HH-60H Seahawk crashed into the Pacific Ocean 16 miles (26 km) SW of San Diego, California. The aircraft was on a routine training flight and returning to the aircraft carrier USS Nimitz when the accident occurred off of Point Loma, California, killing all 5 members of its crew. Only 3 bodies were recovered.

20 May
Indonesian Air Force Lockheed L-100 Hercules A-1325 crashed into the village of Geplak, near Madiun, East Java, killing at least 98 people.

21 May
A US Air Force test pilot student was killed when his Northrop T-38A Talon jet trainer crashed N of Edwards Air Force Base, California, ~ nine miles N of the base, near California City.

26 May
A Força Aérea Brasileira Embraer EMB 110 Bandeirante (C-95) FAB 2332; a twin-engined turboprop transport made a heavy landing at Base Aérea do Campo dos Afonsos, Rio de Janeiro, Brazil. The accident occurred when the landing gear failed to operate.

28 May
A Nigerian Air Force Van's Aircraft RV-6A Air Beetle crashed near Kaduna, Nigeria on a training flight, both occupants killed.

=== June ===
2 June
A Royal Jordanian Air Force Slingsby T-67 Firefly while on a routine training flight being flown by a cadet pilot and instructor, crashed near the Al-Hassan Industrial Estate, Irbid, Jordan. The pilot, due to a technical fault, was unable to recover from a spin leaving 1 crew dead and 1 injured.

4 June
A Hellenic Air Force Lockheed Martin F-16C Fighting Falcon, 93-1059, '059', of the 347 Fighter Squadron based at Nea Anchialos Airforce Base crashed near the village of Michalitsi part of the Tzoumerka National Park, Ioannina, Greece. The aircraft, flying with another F-16 from the 111th Combat Wing, suffered a bird strike, and engine failure forced the pilot to eject; he survived uninjured.

8 June
An Indonesian Army locally-built MBB Bo 105 crashed while flying in bad weather near to Situhaing village on West Java, killing all five occupants.

9 June
An Indian Air Force Antonov An-32 Cline transport aircraft crashed near a village in West Siang district of Arunachal Pradesh killing 13 defence personnel. The aircraft crashed over the Rinchi Hill above Heyo village, about 30 km from Mechuka advance landing ground in the district located about 60 km from the Indo-Chinese Line of Actual Control. Among the seven IAF men and six Army personnel on board the ill-fated aircraft were two wing commanders, two squadron leaders and a flight lieutenant.

9 June
A Vietnamese People's Air Force Sukhoi Su-22M3/4 Fitter J/K crashed into a cornfield near Chieng Bay Hill, Thanh Hóa Province, Vietnam killing the pilot. The aircraft from the 923rd Fighter Regiment was on a routine training flight and suffered mechanical failure.

12 June
An Indonesian Air Force locally-built Aérospatiale SA 330J Puma crashed at Bogor, West Java during a test flight following maintenance of the helicopter, all four occupants killed.

14 June
A Royal Air Force Grob Tutor collided with a glider near Abingdon, Oxfordshire, England, killing a reservist pilot and an Air Training Corps cadet. The glider pilot parachuted to safety.

16 June
Two Spanish Air Force McDonnell-Douglas F/A-18 Hornets collided in midair near the Canary Islands, Spain. Both pilots ejected safely.

17 June
A Russian Air Force Sukhoi Su-24MR Fencer crashed on landing at the Monchegorsk Airforce Base, Murmansk Oblast, Russia. The aircraft from the 98th Separate Reconnaissance Aviation Regiment suffered a heavy landing forcing the 2 crew to eject safely.

18 June
An Indian Air Force Mikoyan MiG-21 Bison from the Chabua Air Force Station, Assam, India crashed due to a technical fault while on a routine training flight, the pilot successfully ejecting from the aircraft.

19 June
A Russian Air Force Sukhoi Su-24MR Fencer crashed near the village of Kostino-Bystrianská, Rostov-on-Don, Rostov Oblast, Russia. The aircraft from the 1st Composite Air Division, North Caucasus Military District suffered a mechanical fault forcing the 2 crew to eject safely after several aborted landings. The Russian Airforce fleet of Sukhoi Su-24 was grounded for technical inspection after 2 accidents in a week.

22 June
A United States Army Bell TH-67 Creek crashed near Hartfield, Alabama on a training mission, one of the two occupants killed.

22 June
A United States Air Force Lockheed Martin F-16CM Fighting Falcon, 89-2108, from the 421st Fighter Squadron, 388th Fighter Wing, based at Hill Air Force Base, Ogden, Utah crashed on a night training flight on the Utah Test and Training Range. The pilot, Capt. George B. Houghton, died in the crash which occurred 35 miles (56 km) S of Wendover, Utah.

=== July ===
2 July
A Royal Air Force Panavia Tornado F.3 crashed near the Rest and Be Thankful beauty spot in Glen Kinglass, Arrochar, Scotland. The aircraft was on a routine training flight from No. 43 Squadron RAF Leuchars in Fife resulting in 2 crew killed in the accident. The crew were pilot Kenneth Thompson and weapons systems officer Nigel Morton.

3 July
A Fuerza Aérea Argentina Dassault Aviation Mirage III from Grupo 6 de Caza based at Tandil Airport, Buenos Aires Province, Argentina crashed into open countryside near Benito Juárez and the pilot successfully ejected from the aircraft.

3 July
A Pakistan Army Mil Mi-17 helicopter crashed at Chapar Feroze Khel near Peshawar, Pakistan due to a technical fault resulting in 26 fatalities.

3 July
A Belgian Air Component Piper L-21B Super Cub crashes on take-off at Goetsenhoven Military Airfield, Flanders, Belgium killing the 2 crew. The aircraft which was used as a glider-tug collided with a nearby hangar, crashing into a field and caught fire.

7 July
A Serbian Air Force MiG-29 crashed while performing aerobatic manoeuvres in preparation for an upcoming airshow, killing the pilot Lt. Col. Rade Randjelovic and a soldier on the ground, while injuring another.

15 July
A Republic of China Air Force Northrop F-5F (5410) from the 7th Tactical Fighter Group based at Ching Chuan Kang Air Base crashed on a routine training flight of the coast of Penghu, Taiwan killing the 2 crew.

16 July
A Pakistan Air Force Lockheed Martin F-16A Fighting Falcon, 92729, on a routine night training exercise from No. 9 Squadron from Mushaf Airbase crashed 105 km south-west of Sargodha, Pakistan resulting in the death of the pilot, Squadron Leader Saud Ghulam Nabi. Another source gives the accident date as 17 July.

17 July

A Fuerza Aérea Venezolana Cessna T206H (FAV-2807) flying from Puerto Ayacucho to La Esmeralda, Estado Amazonas, Venezuela crashed into the hillside of El Duida, 20 miles (32 km) from its destination at La Esmeralda airport, killing the 3 crew members.

18 July
A United States Air Force McDonnell Douglas F-15E Strike Eagle from the 336th Fighter Squadron, based at Seymour Johnson AFB, North Carolina, flying in support of ISAF coalition operations, crashed in eastern Afghanistan. The two aircrew, Capt. Thomas J. Gramith and Capt. Mark R. McDowell died in the incident.

19 July
A People's Liberation Army Air Force Xian JH-7 (FBC-1 Flying Leopard) crashed near the Taonan tactical training base in Jilin province while on a joint counter-terrorism exercises with Russia resulting in the death of 2 crew.

20 July

A Royal Air Force Panavia Tornado GR.4 operating with RAF No. 1 Squadron crashed on take-off at Kandahār International Airport in Afghanistan and the two crew members successfully eject from the aircraft.

20 July
A Chilean Air Force Extra 300L aerobatic aircraft crashed 15 km south of Santiago, Chile. The pilot was seriously injured.

20 July
An IAI Kfir jet fighter crashed near the city of Cartagena, Colombia. The Israeli pilots operating the aircraft were unharmed in the incident, but the jet itself was destroyed. Israel Aerospace Industries said in a statement that the aircraft was flying a refresher flight, and that the aircraft did not come to a stop on the landing strip, landing outside it. The director of the Israel Aerospace Industries announced that an investigation into the incident had already begun and that a panel to probe the crash had been appointed.

21 July
A United States Navy Sikorsky HH-60H 163790 crashed on a training flight at Fort Pickett, Blackstone, Virginia, United States; minor injuries only.

23 July
A Turkish Air Force McDonnell Douglas F-4 Phantom II crashed on take-off after from the Erhaç Air Base in Malatya, Turkey due to a technical fault caused by drop-tank falling from the aircraft. The two crew members successfully eject from the aircraft and were hospitalized after the incident.

23 July
An Uzbekistan Air and Air Defence Forces Mil Mi-24 Hind Helicopter on a routine training exercise crashes near the airport of Chirchiq, Tashkent Province, Uzbekistan killing the 2 crew.

31 July
An Indian Air Force HAL HPT-32 Deepak a prop-driven primary military trainer crashes in the Medak district of the Andhra Pradesh state killing the 2 crew.

=== August ===
5 August
A Pakistan Air Force Chengdu FT-7 crashed near Attock, northwest Pakistan, killing the pilot.

6 August
A Swedish Air Force Saab JAS 39 Gripen C from Blekinge Wing (F 17) suffered a heavy landing at Ronneby Airport, Sweden caused by the failure of the under-carriage to operate after a fire alarm was trigged and the pilot was uninjured in the incident.

16 August
Two Russian Knights air display Sukhoi Su-27 jets collided whilst training, killing one pilot, Igor Tkachenko, and injuring several civilians on the ground. The accident occurred near Zhukovsky Airfield, outside of Moscow.

16 August
An Islamic Republic of Iran Air Force Bell 214ST crashed on a training flight near Karaj, Iran, four killed.

19 August
A United States Army Sikorsky UH-60 Black Hawk from Fort Campbell, Kentucky the home base of the 101st Airborne, crashed while on a training exercise being carried-out by the 160th Special Operations Aviation Regiment (Airborne). The accident occurred 400 ft below the summit of the 14,421 feet high (4,268 m) Mount Massive in the Sawatch Range, Colorado leaving 2 crew dead, 1 injured and 1 crew member missing.

21 August
An Indian Navy British Aerospace Sea Harrier FRS.51 crashed shortly after take-off from Dabolim Airport near Goa, India. The aircraft on a routine flight crashed into the Arabian Sea of the coast of Goa killing the pilot Lt. Cdr. Saurav Saxena.

27 August
A Hellenic Air Force PZL-Mielec M-18 Dromader fire-fighting aircraft from the 359 Public Services Air Support Unit based at Andravida Airforce Base crashed after hitting high-voltage cables. The accident occurred while fighting a forest fire in the village of Katseli near Argostoli, Kefalonia, Greece resulting in the death of the pilot.

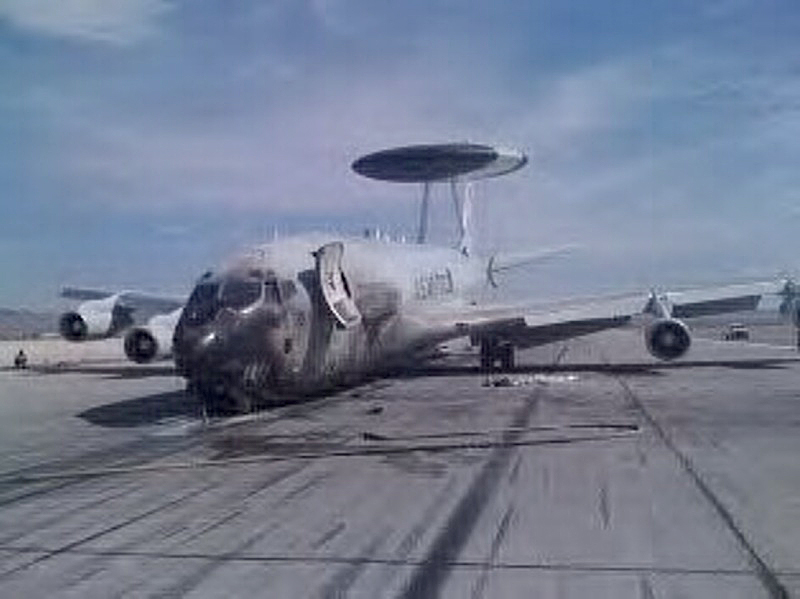
Fire damaged USAF E-3C, 83-0008, on Nellis AFB, Nevada, ramp.

28 August
A United States Air Force Boeing E-3C Sentry, 83-0008, (AEW&C) while returning from the Red Flag Exercise 09–5 with the 552d Air Control Wing from Tinker Air Force Base, Oklahoma, made a forced landing at Nellis Air Force Base. Due to a fire the aircraft was damaged and the crew of 32 were safely evacuated and the fire extinguished by Nellis AFB emergency response crew.

30 August
A Belarusian Air Force Sukhoi Su-27 Flanker was lost during Radom Airshow 2009, Poland. The aircraft crashed near the Małęczyn village, outside the military air base the event took place on. No civilian was injured. There was no damage reported on the ground. The crew of two did not eject and were found dead by the rescue teams.

=== September ===
7 September
An Indonesian Air Force Government Aircraft Factories Nomad P837 on a routine flight crashed near a local village of Sekatak Matadau, Bulungan district in East Kalimantan killing 4 of the 9 passengers and crew.

10 September
A Spanish Air Force Dassault Mirage F1 crashed in the Cazorla Natural Park, near Jaén, Spain, while in a training flight. The pilot ejected and suffered minor injuries.

10 September
An Armada de México Bell 406 Helicopter on a routine patrol crashed near the 27 kilometre post on the Perote-Los Humeros Highway, Veracruz State, Mexico, resulting in 2 crew injured and 3 fatalities.

12 September
An Indian Air Force Mikoyan MiG-21 Bison from the Bhatinda Airforce Station, Punjab, India crashed due to a technical fault near the village of Muktsar-Bhatinda in the Punjab Provence, Pakistan killing the pilot.

13 September
An Israeli Air Force Lockheed Martin F-16A Fighting Falcon 140, from the Nevatim Israeli Air Force Base, Beersheba, Israel crashed near the P'nei Chever settlement in the Southern Hebron Hills at 1345 hrs. killing the pilot. The incident occurred during military training including a simulated dogfight with another aircraft. During a sharp turn, the pilot Captain Assaf Ramon (the son of Colonel Ilan Ramon who died in the Space Shuttle Columbia disaster in 2003), suffered either loss of consciousness or mechanical failure leading to the crash.

17 September
An Indonesian Air Force FFA AS-202 Bravo on a routine training flight crashed into a rice field in Sragen, Central Java killing the pilot.

19 September
A United States Army Sikorsky UH-60 Black Hawk crashed at Joint Base Balad, (formerly Al-Bakr Air Base), Balad, Iraq. The accident occurred during a storm including high winds and a sandstorm resulting in 12 crew injured and 1 fatality.

22 September
Islamic Republic of Iran Air Force Ilyushin Il-76MD AWACS aircraft 5-8208 "Simorgh" collided with an Iranian Air Force Northrop F-5E Tiger II during a military parade near Varamin, Iran resulting in 7 fatalities.

24 September
An Aeronavale test flight involving two Dassault Rafale aircraft flying back to the Aircraft Carrier Charles de Gaulle (R91) collided in midair. The incident occurred in the Mediterranean of the coast of Perpignan, Pyrénées-Orientales, France and one pilot was rescued after ejecting from the aircraft; the second pilot was listed as missing.

28 September
A Japan Maritime Self-Defense Force (JMSDF) NAMC YS-11 a twin-engined turboprop transport crashed while landing at JMSDF Ozuki Air Field in Shimonoseki, Yamaguchi Prefecture, Japan. The landing in light rain, the aircraft suffered an overshoot of the runway and crashed through the airfield perimeter fence, crossing a service road and plunged nose-first into a rice field. The 11 JMSDF crew members of the aircraft were uninjured and the NAMC YS-11 aircraft suffered bent propellers.

=== October ===
2 October
A Yemeni Air Force Mikoyan MiG-21 Fishbed crashed during a low-flying exercise due to mechanical failure.

2 October
A Fuerza Aérea Mexicana Cessna 182S Skylane (FAM-5498) crashes near San José Querendaro, Michoacán, Mexico. The aircraft on a reconnaissance flight from Morelia Airport crashed in the mountains of Michoacán with 3 crew fatalities.

3 October
A Fuerza Aérea Boliviana Aérospatiale Aérospatiale SA 315B Lama Helicopter (FAB-730) from the Escuadrón 511 crashed into the wall of a building on the Pampa near the city of Cochabamba, Bolivia leaving 4 crew dead, 1 crew member injured and 1 civilian on the ground injured.

7 October
A Libyan Air Force Mikoyan MiG-23 Flogger crashed while taking part during an airshow for the Third Libyan Aviation Exhibition, LAVEX 2009 held at Mitiga International Airport, Tripoli, Libya. The aircraft travelling at low-level hit a one-storey house in the suburb of Souq Al-Jumaa in Tripoli killing the 2 crew and injuring two civilians.

9 October
A Fuerza Aérea Uruguaya EADS CASA C-212-200 Aviocar (FAU-531/UN-146) a twin-engined turboprop transport aircraft, on a reconnaissance flight crashed near Fonds-Verrettes, Ouest, Haiti. The aircraft taking part in the United Nations Stabilization Mission in Haiti crashed into a mountainside near the remote village of Pays-Pourri killing the 11 crew.

12 October
An Irish Air Corps Pilatus PC-9M flying in poor weather conditions crashed at Crumlin East near Cornamona in County Galway, Ireland killing the flying instructor and cadet pilot.

15 October
A United States Air Force Lockheed Martin F-16C Fighting Falcon, 91-0365, was lost during a routine night flying exercise from the 77th Fighter Squadron, 20th Fighter Wing, based at the Shaw Air Force Base, Sumter, South Carolina when it collided mid-air with F-16C 91-0364. The two aircraft from the 20th Fighter Wing were training with night vision equipment and practising combat tactics when the accident occurred 40 miles (64 km) east of Folly Beach, South Carolina at ~2030 hrs. The United States Coast Guard commenced a search for a missing aircraft in the North Atlantic of the coast of South Carolina while the second aircraft, piloted by Capt. Lee Bryant, despite damage was able to land at Charleston Air Force Base. on 16 October, Coast Guard searchers found crash debris in the Atlantic Ocean believed to belong to the missing F-16. "The Coast Guard has found some debris in the ocean that is apparently from our missing F-16", said Robert Sexton, the Shaw Air Force Base Public Affairs chief in Sumter, South Carolina. The other pilot, Capt. Nicholas Giglio, is missing. "They have not yet found any sign of the pilot and the search continues", Mr. Sexton said. No one witnessed what happened to Captain Giglio after the collision.

17 October
A United States Marine Corps McDonnell Douglas F/A-18D Hornet (164729) from the Marine All Weather Fighter Attack Squadron No. 224 VMFA(AW)-224 based at the Marine Corps Air Station Beaufort, Beaufort, South Carolina experienced a heavy landing at Jacksonville International Airport, Duval County, Florida. The aircraft with two other Marine F/A-18 Hornet aircraft were landing at Jacksonville Airport in preparation for a flyover at the nearby NFL Jacksonville Jaguars game when the aircraft experienced an airborne technical fault and the port landing-gear collapsed causing the aircraft to land only on the nose-wheel, starboard undercarriage and the exposed port-side external fuel-tank. The F/A-18 Hornet skidded down the runway with most damage occurring to the grounded external fuel-tank. The 2 Marine crew members were uninjured.

22 October
A United States Army Sikorsky UH-60 Black Hawk Helicopter while on a routine training exercise crashed onto the deck of the USNS Arctic off the coast of Fort Story, Virginia Beach, Virginia. The Black Hawk helicopter from the 160th Special Operations Aviation Regiment (Airborne) was on a joint exercise with the United States Navy SEALs and was practising fast maritime interdiction by rappelling by rope to the ship's deck when the accident occurred killing 1 crew and injuring a further 8 service personnel.

23 October
An Indian Air Force Mikoyan MiG-27 flying from the Hasimara Air Force Base, Eastern Air Command crashes near New Jalpaiguri, West Bengal, India. The aircraft on a routine training exercise suffered a technical fault and an on-board engine fire shortly after take-off. After a successful ejection the pilot parachuted into a nearby tea estate and the aircraft crashed into a nearby river bank injuring two children.

29 October
A Força Aérea Brasileira Cessna 208 FAB-2725 flying from Cruzeiro do Sul, Acre to Tabatinga crash-landed in the Ituí River a small tributary of the Rio Javari, Amazonas State. The twin-engined turboprop aircraft of the 7º Esquadrão de Transporte Aéreo from Base Aérea de Manaus was transporting officials from Brazilian Ministry of Health participating in a vaccination programme when the aircraft crashed landed between the Amazonian villages of Aurelius and New River. The aircraft was later found by indigenous villagers of the region, discovering 9 survivors and 2 dead crew members.

29 October
A United States Coast Guard Lockheed HC-130H-7 Hercules, USCG 1705, from Coast Guard Air Station Sacramento, California, collided with a United States Marine Corps Bell AH-1W SuperCobra Attack Helicopter, BuNo 164596, of HMLA-469, 15 miles (24 km) E of San Clemente Island, off of the coast of Southern California, killing all seven Coast Guard aircrew and both Marine aircrew.

=== November ===
6 November
A Russian Naval Aviation Tupolev Tu-142 M3 from the 310th Independent Long Range Anti-Submarine Aviation Regiment based at Kamenny Ruchey Airbase crashed 15–20 km from the coast of Cape Datta north of Sovetskaya Gavan. The Naval aircraft on a routine training exercise crashed into the sea in the Tatar Strait near the island of Sakhalin with the loss of all 11 crew.

23 November
An Aeronautica Militare Italiana Lockheed Martin C-130J Hercules, MM62176, engaged in a training mission, crashed on train tracks bordering Pisa airport, while climbing and performing a left turn immediately after take-off from Galileo Galilei Airport. The aircraft immediately burst into flames, killing its five-member crew.

27 November
A Sri Lanka Air Force Mil Mi-24 Helicopter (CH635) engaged on a training mission, crashed 5 km north of Buttala(310 km south-east of Colombo) at approximately 1330 HRS due to technical failure. Prior to the crash the pilot reported a power failure to the tail rotor. Pilot, Co-Pilot and 2 door gunners died in this incident.

30 November
An Indian Air Force Sukhoi Su-30MKI crashed near Jethagaon in Jaisalmer of Rajasthan after it took off from Jodhpur. The crash happened while returning from a regular training mission. Both pilots were unharmed.

=== December ===
8 December
A Japan Maritime Self-Defense Force Sikorsky HH-60H Seahawk Helicopter crashed and sank off the coast of Nagasaki. Two crew members were killed, while a third was rescued.

16 December
Pakistan Air Force Dassault Mirage III fighter aircraft crashed during a training mission due to a technical fault. The pilot managed to eject safely, landing in the Durrab Lake, (Kallar Kahar) and was rescued by a boat.

23 December
Royal Thai Air Force Northrop F-5E 21118/91681 from 211 Sq. crashed in Thailand. Pilot Chatchawan Rassamee died.

== See also ==
- List of accidents and incidents involving the Lockheed C-130 Hercules
- Lists of accidents and incidents involving military aircraft
