= Training field =

Training field or training area may refer to:

- Military training area
- Training Field, historical name for the Winthrop Square (Charlestown, Boston)
- Training ground, e.g., in association football

== See also ==
- Training camp
- Training centre (disambiguation)
