= Łask Air Base =

Base in Poland

Coordinates: 51.5516°N 19.1791°E

32nd Air Base
- Near Łask, Łask County in Poland
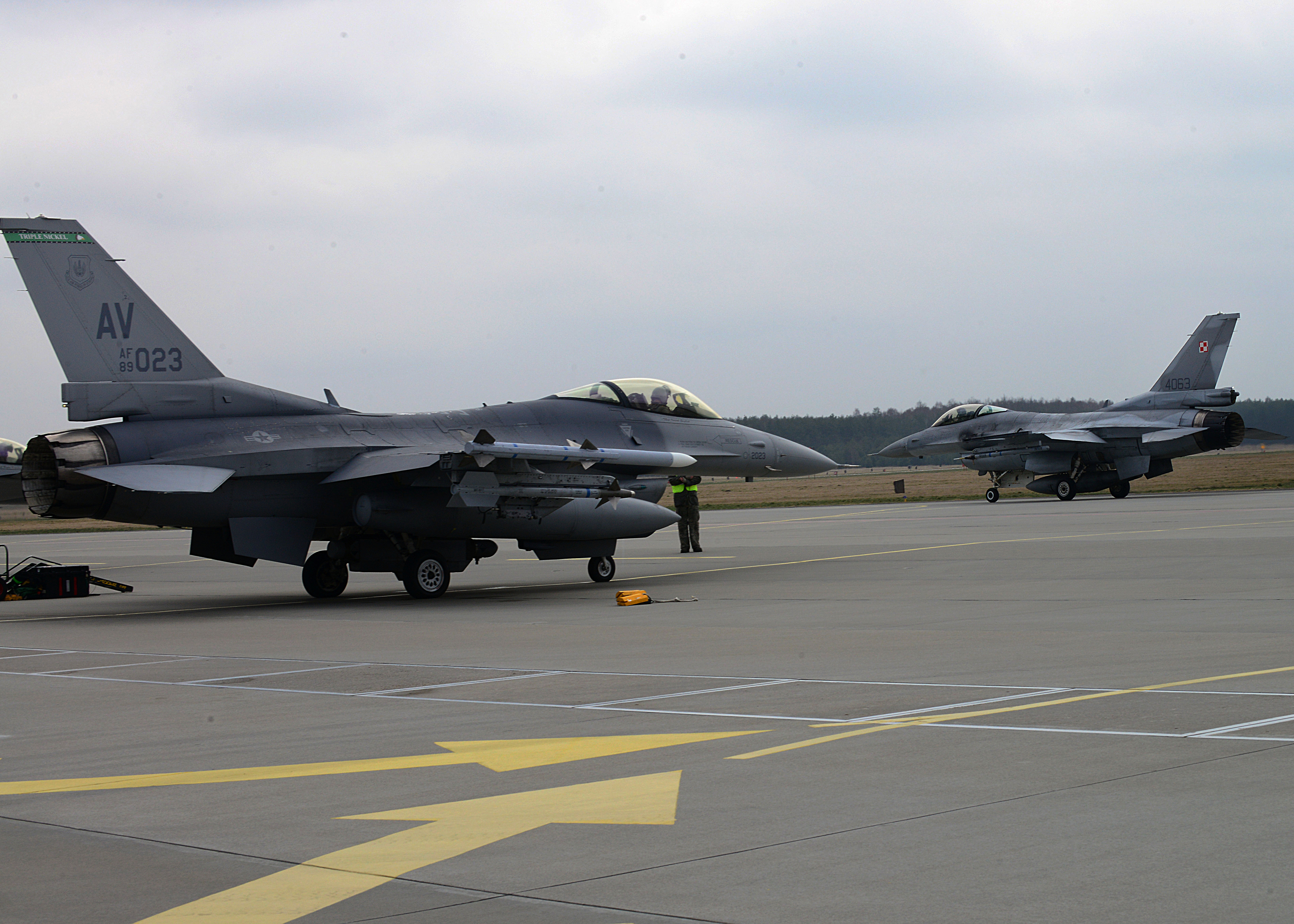
- A Polish and a US F-16 Fighting Falcon at Łask in 2014

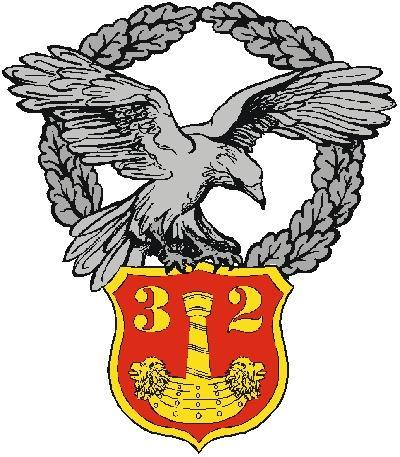

Site information
- Owner: Ministry of Defence
- Operator: Polish Air Force

Site history
- Built: 1957
- In use: 2001-Present

Garrison information
- Current commander: Colonel Krzysztof Duda
- Garrison: 10th Tactical Squadron

Airfield information
- Identifiers: ICAO: EPLK
- Elevation: 639 feet (195 m) AMSL
Runways
Direction	Length and surface
10/28	3,000 metres (9,843 ft) Paved
- Source: DoD FLIP

32nd Air Base (Polish: 32. Baza Lotnicza) (ICAO: EPLK) is a Polish Air Force base, located in Łask, about 30 km south-west of Łódź. It is one of the two bases where Poland's F-16 fighters are stationed, the other being 31st Air Base. 9 of them were first moved there in October 2008. The goal is to have 16 fighters, operated by the 10th Tactical Squadron.

A detachment of the US Air Force has been permanently based at Łask since November, 2012. Additional units rotate to the base periodically to conduct training exercises. The force is thought to be nuclear-capable and has joined nuclear exercises with NATO.

The base airfield was built in 1957. The current base unit, combining infrastructure and ground personnel, was formed in 2001.

In the past there were plans to use this airfield for civilian airliners, but with the expansion of nearby Łódź Władysław Reymont Airport these have been shelved.
