= Career center (disambiguation) =

A career center, also called a vocational school, is a type of educational institution.

Career centre or Career Center may also refer to:

- Career Center (Winston-Salem, North Carolina), USA
- Employment center

== See also ==
- Career Enrichment Center
- Training centre (disambiguation)
