= Juventus Training Center =

Juventus Training Center (JTC) may refer to:

- Juventus Training Center (Vinovo), an Italian football facility in Vinovo, 14 kilometres from the city of Turin
- Juventus Training Center (Turin), an Italian football facility in the city of Turin
