= Army Training Centre =

Army Training Centre may refer to:

- Sri Lanka Military Academy in Sri Lanka
- Army Training Centres in the German Army of the Bundeswehr
- Army Training Centre Pirbright in the United Kingdom
