= Infantry Training Centre =

Infantry Training Centre may refer to:

- Infantry Training Centre (British Army)
- Infantry Training Centre (Sri Lanka Army)

== See also ==
- School of Infantry
