= Naval Air Technical Training Center =

Naval Air Technical Training Center may refer to:

- Naval Air Technical Training Center Norman, Oklahoma
- Naval Air Technical Training Center Ward Island, Texas
- Naval Air Station Pensacola, Florida
