= Olympic Training Center =

Olympic Training Center may refer to:

- United States Olympic Training Center
- Olympic Training Center (Rio de Janeiro)
- Olympic Training Center Velodrome
