= Kuroslepy =

- Municipality
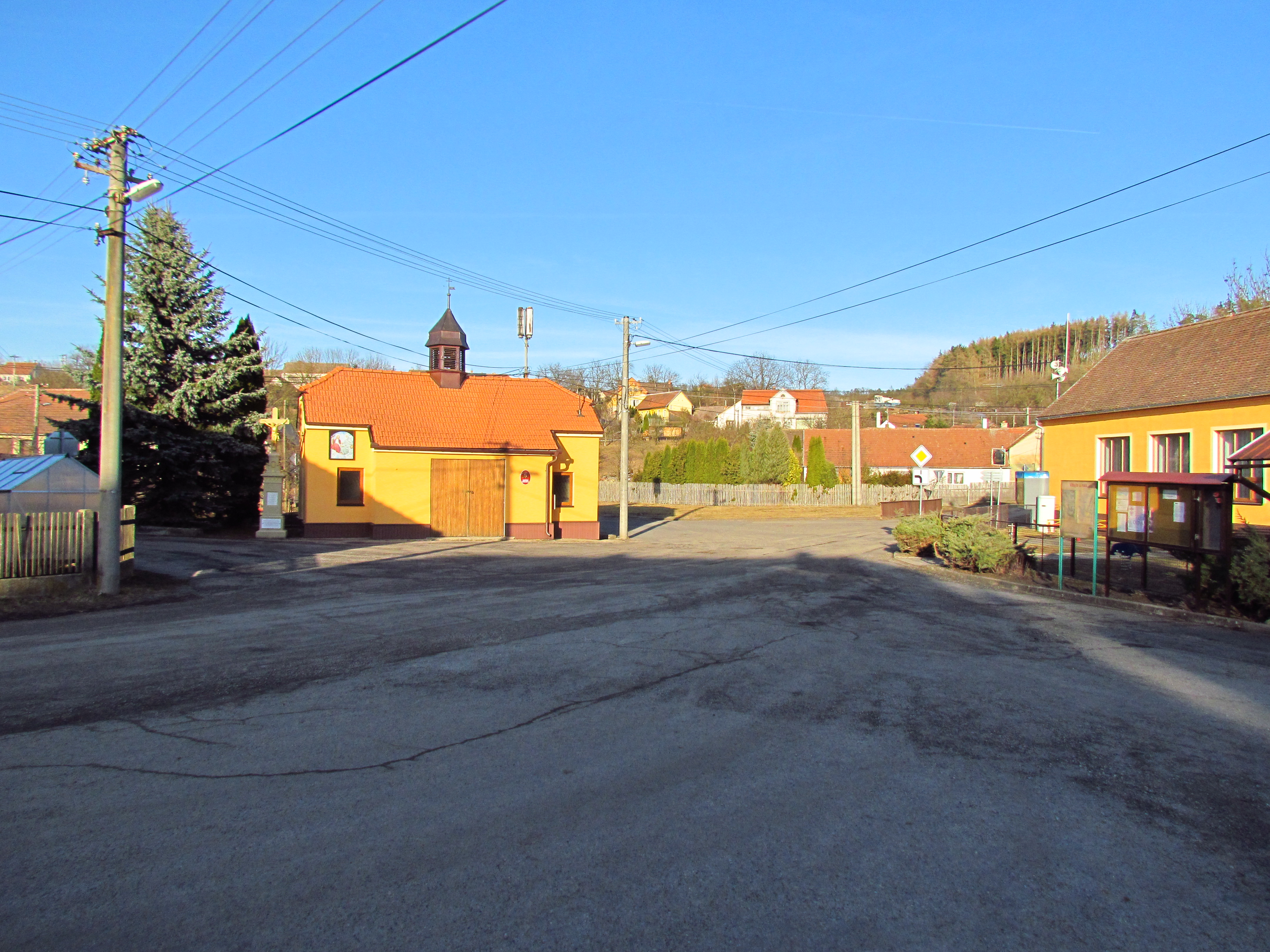
- Centre of Kuroslepy

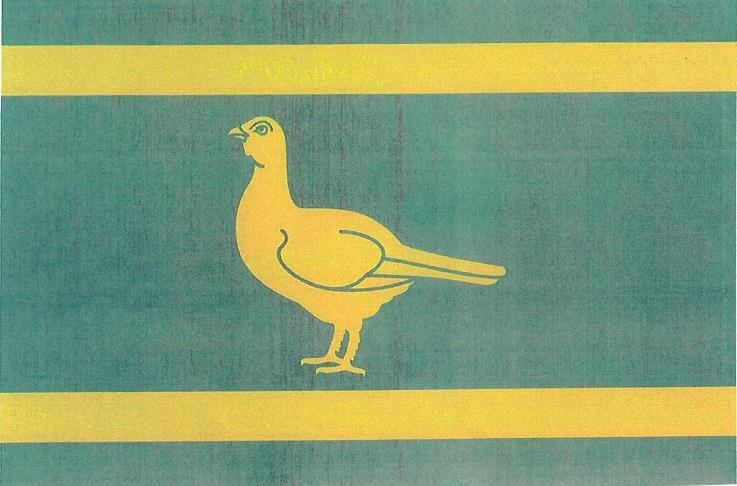
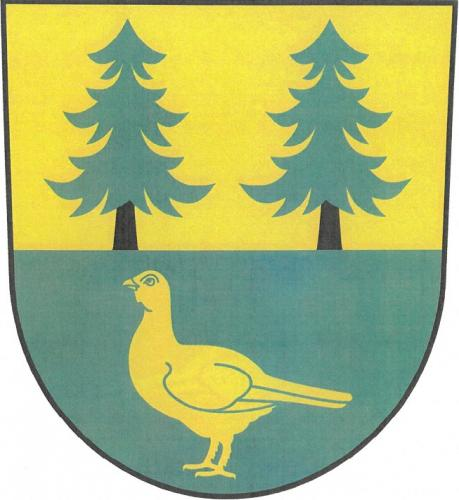
- Flag Coat of arms

- Location in the Czech Republic
- Coordinates: 49°9′16″N 16°12′36″E
- Country: Czech Republic
- Region: Vysočina
- District: Třebíč
- First mentioned: 1349

Area
  - Total: 8.55 km^{2} (3.30 sq mi)
- Elevation: 334 m (1,096 ft)

Population (2026-01-01)
  - Total: 156
  - Density: 18.2/km^{2} (47.3/sq mi)
- Time zone: UTC+1 (CET)
  - Summer (DST): UTC+2 (CEST)
- Postal code: 675 75
- Website: www.kuroslepy.cz

Kuroslepy is a municipality and village in Třebíč District in the Vysočina Region of the Czech Republic. It has about 200 inhabitants.

Kuroslepy lies approximately 26 kilometres (16 mi) east of Třebíč, 53 km (33 mi) south-east of Jihlava, and 166 km (103 mi) south-east of Prague.

== Demographics ==
Historical population
Year	Pop.	±%
1869	262	—
1880	261	−0.4%
1890	301	+15.3%
1900	313	+4.0%
1910	349	+11.5%
1921	360	+3.2%
1930	343	−4.7%
1950	297	−13.4%
1961	321	+8.1%
1970	287	−10.6%
1980	248	−13.6%
1991	201	−19.0%
2001	185	−8.0%
2011	162	−12.4%
2021	159	−1.9%
Source: Censuses
