= 7th Tactical Squadron =

- 7.ELT Logo
- Active: 1999 - present
- Country: Poland
- Allegiance: Polish Air Force
- Type: Tactical Squadron
- Role: Attack, Reconnaissance
- Base: 33rd Air Base

Commanders
- Squadron Leader: Col. Maciej Trelka

Aircraft flown
- Attack: Su-22 M4K, Su-22 M3K

7th Tactical Squadron (known as 7.ELT – 7 Eskadra Lotnictwa Taktycznego in Poland) is a fighter squadron of Polish Air Force established in December 1999 after the 7th Strike Reconnaissance Wing was disbanded. The squadron is stationed in 33rd Air Base and operates Su-22 attack aircraft.
