= 1st Tactical Squadron =

1st Tactical Squadron "Warszawa"
- 1.ELT Coat of Arms
- Active: 2001 - 2010
- Country: Poland
- Allegiance: Polish Air Force
- Type: Tactical Squadron
- Role: Air Defence, QRA, Air Superiority, etc.

Commanders
- Squadron Leader: Unknown

Aircraft flown
- Fighter: MiG-29, MiG-29UB
- Utility helicopter: Mi-2
- Trainer: PZL TS-11 Iskra

1st Tactical Squadron (known as 1.ELT - 1 Eskadra Lotnictwa Taktycznego in Poland) is a fighter squadron of Polish Air Force established in 2001 in Mińsk Mazowiecki, Poland and disbanded on the 30th of June 2010, as part of Decyzja nr Z-31/Org./P1 z 25 sierpnia 2009 r.. This squadron was stationed at the 23rd Air Base and operated MiG-29 9.12A and MiG-29UB 9.51A jet fighters. This unit was created on the base of 1st Fighter Regiment (1944–2001).

== Equipment ==
Aircraft	Origin	Type	In service	Notes
MiG-29	Soviet Union	Tactical Fighter	13	
MiG-29UB	Soviet Union	Tactical Fighter / Trainer	3	
PZL TS-11 Iskra	Poland	Jet Trainer	2	
Mi-2	Poland \ Soviet Union	Utility Helicopter	4	
