= 10th Tactical Squadron =

- 10.ELT Logo
- Active: 2008 - present
- Country: Poland
- Allegiance: Polish Air Force
- Type: Tactical Squadron
- Role: Providing Air Superiority, Reconnaissance
- Base: 32nd Air Base

Commanders
- Squadron Leader: Col. Rafał ZADENCKI

Aircraft flown
- Fighter: F-16C, F-16D

10th Tactical Squadron (known as 10.ELT - 10 Eskadra Lotnictwa Taktycznego in Poland) is a fighter squadron of Polish Air Force established in 2008 in Łask, Poland. The squadron is stationed at 32nd Air Base and since 1 October 2008 operates the F-16 C/D Block 52+ Adv.

In March 2012 the squadron deployed to Israeli Air Force base Ovda for a two-week-long joint exercise with Israel's 115, 117 and 106 squadrons.
