= 36th Special Aviation Regiment =

36th Special Regiment of Aviation Transport
- 36 Specjalny Pułk Lotnictwa Transportowego (Polish)
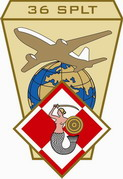
- 36 SPLT Logo
- Active: 1945–2011
- Country: Poland
- Allegiance: Polish Air Force
- Type: Special Aviation Regiment
- Role: VIP Transport, Transport
- Part of: Regiment
- Base: 1 Baza Lotnicza (1st Air Base) Warszawa district Okęcie

Commanders
- Squadron Leader: Col. pilot (płk pil.) Mirosław Jemielniak

Aircraft flown
- Utility helicopter: Bell 412, PZL W-3 Sokół, Mil Mi-8
- Transport: Tu-154, Yak-40, PZL M28

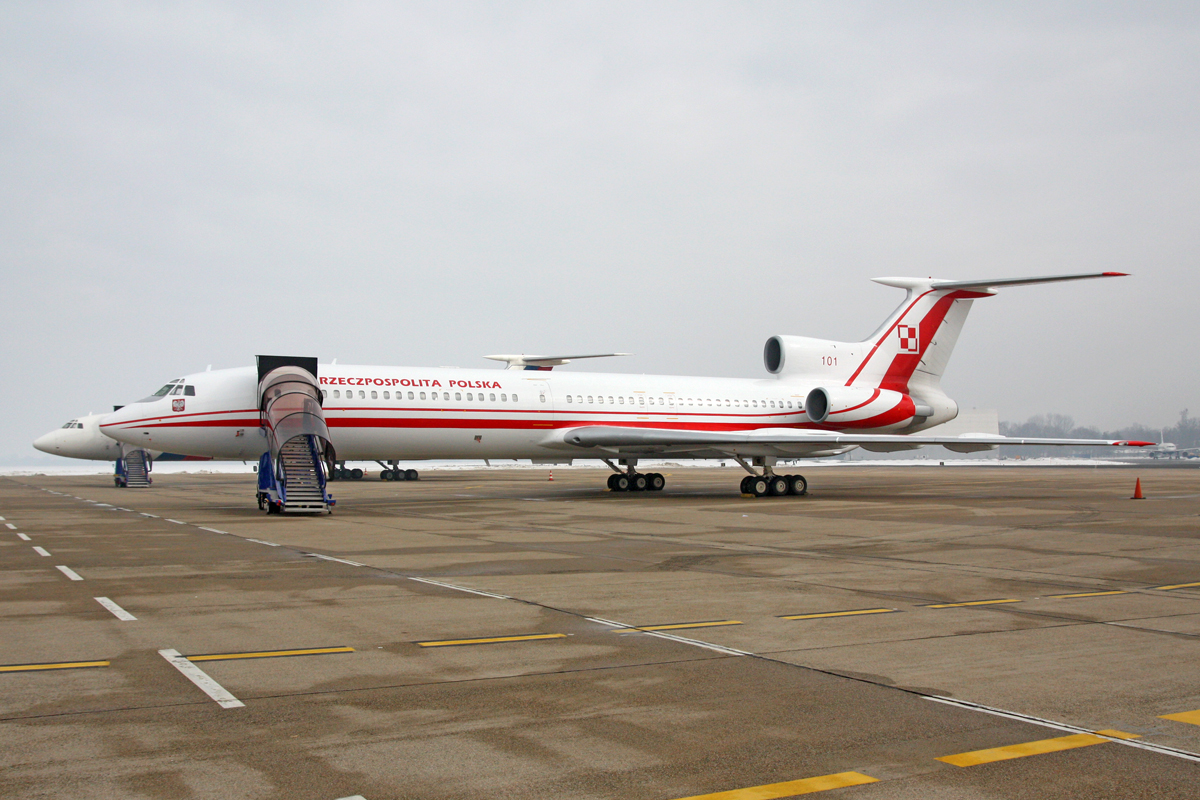
VIP airliner Tupolev Tu-154M Lux at the airport in Zagreb

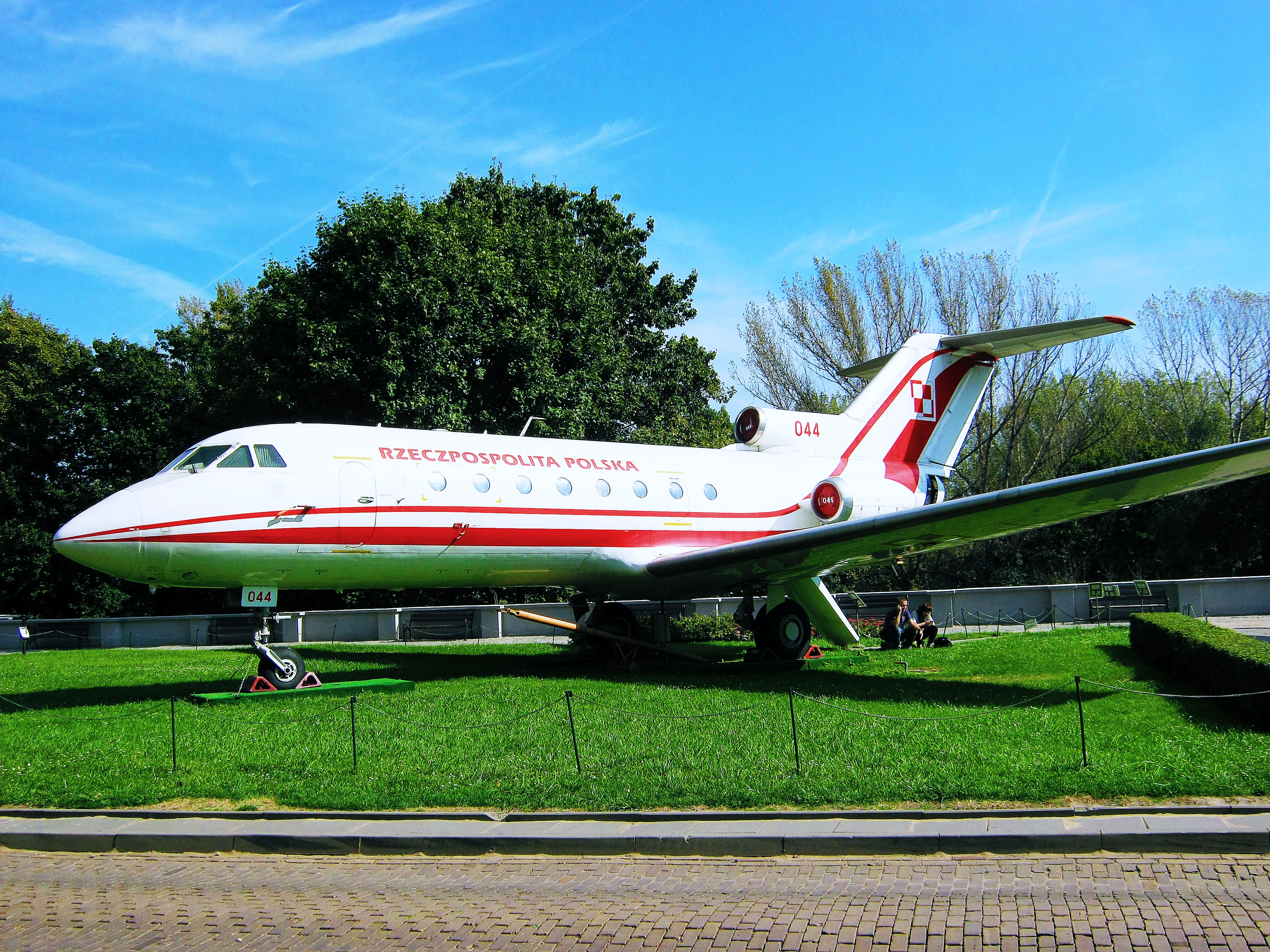
ex Polish Air Force VIP Yakovlev Yak-40, on display at the Polish Army Museum, Warsaw, in 2014

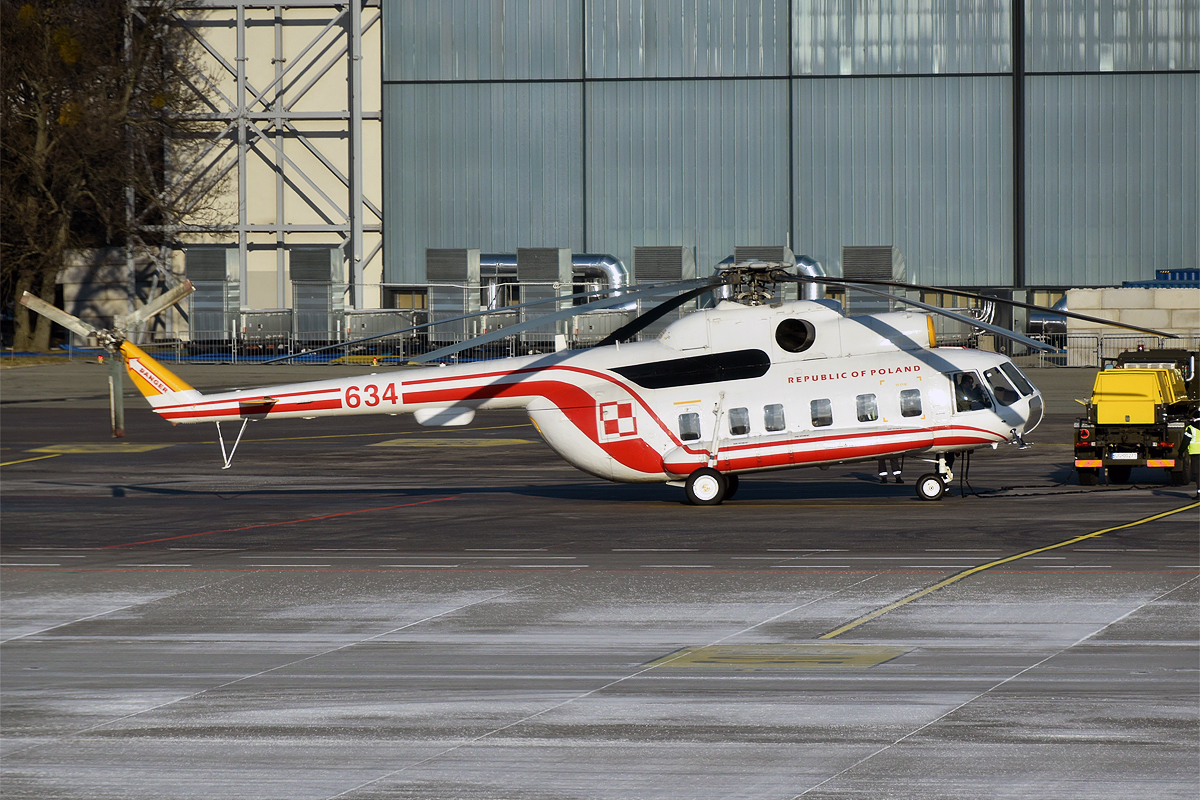
Polish Air Force VIP Mil Mi-8S, still active in 2022

The 36th Special Regiment of Aviation Transport (Polish: 36 Specjalny Pułk Lotnictwa Transportowego; 36 SPLT) was a special aviation regiment of the Polish Air Force, established in 1945. All of its aircraft were for national public use, the most important being transport of Polish politicians and Ministry of National Defence highest officials & forces commanders. It was headquartered at the 1st Air Base at Warsaw Chopin Airport (formerly Okęcie). Between 1947 and 1974 it operated as Special Air Regiment, earlier as Government Transport Squadron. It was shut down in 2011 and its fleet retired.

== Accidents ==
- On 28 February 1973 Antonov An-24V Polish Air Force tail number 012, crashed in Szczecin, north-west Poland. All 18 people on board were killed (including ministers of the interior of Poland and Czechoslovakia).
- On 4 December 2003 Mi-8 helicopter carrying Poland's Prime Minister Leszek Miller crashed near Warsaw, all people on board survived.
- On 10 April 2010 a Tupolev Tu-154 with Polish Air Force serial 101 crashed whilst attempting to land in fog at Smolensk North Airport, Russia. All 96 on board died, including Poland's President Lech Kaczyński and 42 other officials en route to the commemoration of the 70th anniversary of the Katyn massacre nearby. The crash also took lives of the Chief of the General Staff of the Polish Army and most senior military commanding officers, the National Bank of Poland governor, the Deputy Minister of Foreign Affairs and dignitaries in the government, vice-speakers and members of the Senate of the Republic of Poland and Sejm of the Republic of Poland houses of the National Assembly of the Republic of Poland, and senior members of clergy of various denominations.

On 4 August 2011, the regiment was disbanded by the Polish Minister of National Defence as a direct consequence of the 2010 crash. The regiment officially ceased to exist on 31 December 2011; however, the 1st Air Transport Base continues to transport government VIPs by helicopter. In the immediate aftermath of the regiment's closure, all Polish government officials have been using civil aircraft owned by LOT Polish Airlines, mainly two Embraer 175 operated exclusively for government; later, in December 2017, the Polish Air Force acquired 3 Boeing 737s for government use.

== Equipment disbandment in 2011 ==
Previously operated transport aircraft including Lisunov Li-2, Ilyushin Il-14, Antonov An-24 and Tupolev Tu-134.

Model	Origin	Picture	In service
Tupolev Tu-154M Lux	Soviet Union		1
Yakovlev Yak-40	Soviet Union		4
PZL M28	Poland		3
PZL W-3 Sokół	Poland		5
Bell 412	United States		1
Mil Mi-8	Soviet Union		7
