= 8th Tactical Squadron =

8h Tactical Squadron
- Active: 2001 - present
- Country: Poland
- Allegiance: Polish Air Force
- Type: Tactical Squadron
- Role: Attack
- Base: 12th Air Base

Aircraft flown
- Attack: Su-22 M4K, Su-22 M3K

8th Tactical Squadron (Polish: 8 Eskadra Lotnictwa Taktycznego, 8 ELT) is a fighter squadron of the Polish Air Force established in 2001. Squadron is stationed in 12th Air Base and operates Su-22 attack aircraft.
