= VMM-265 =

US Marine Corps transport squadron

Marine Medium Tiltrotor Squadron 265
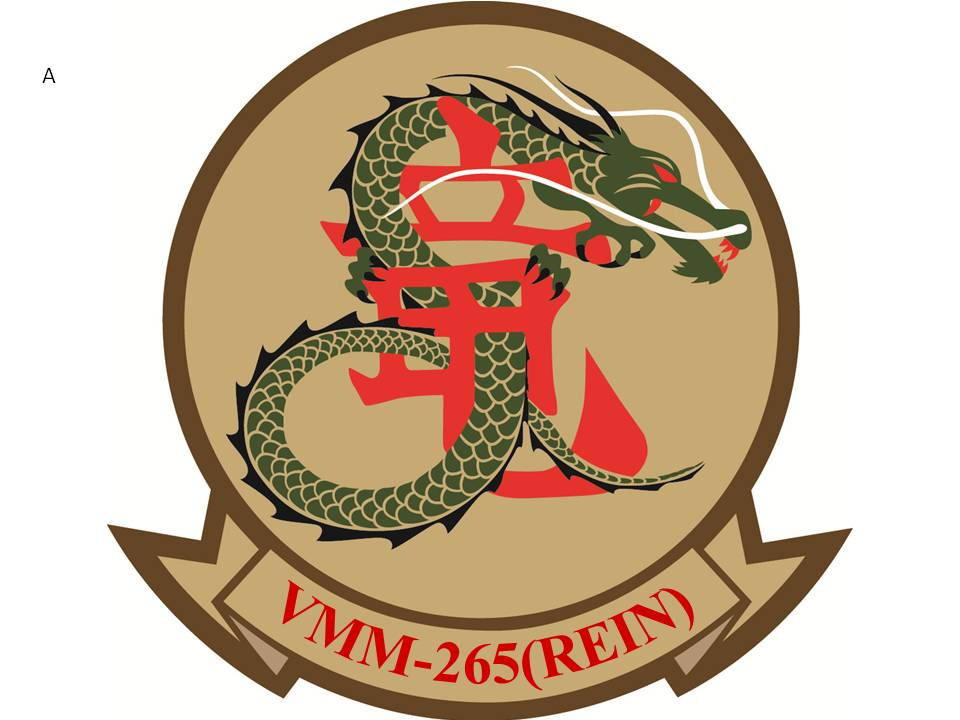
- VMM-265 insignia
- Active: 1 October 1962- 13 November 1970; 1 September 1977 - present
- Country: United States
- Allegiance: United States of America
- Branch: United States Marine Corps
- Type: Medium-lift tiltrotor squadron
- Role: Conduct assault support operations for the Fleet Marine Forces
- Part of: Marine Aircraft Group 36; 1st Marine Aircraft Wing
- Garrison/HQ: Marine Corps Air Station Futenma
- Nickname: "Dragons"
- Mottos: (Historical) "Hic Sunt Dracones" (Current) "It's An Attitude"
- Tail Code: EP
- Engagements: Vietnam War * Operation Hastings; Operation Desert Storm; Operation Sea Angel; Operation Desert Fox; Operation Iraqi Freedom; Iran War

Commanders
- Current commander: LtCol Nicholas D. Peters

Marine Medium Tiltrotor Squadron 265 (VMM-265) is a United States Marine Corps assault support transport squadron consisting of MV-22 Osprey tiltrotor aircraft. The squadron, known as the "Dragons", is based at Marine Corps Air Station Futenma, Okinawa, Japan and falls under the command of Marine Aircraft Group 36 (MAG-36) and the 1st Marine Aircraft Wing (1st MAW).

== Mission ==
The purpose of the squadron is to support the Marine Air-Ground Task Force (MAGTF) Commander by providing assault support transport of combat troops, supplies, and equipment, day or night, under all weather conditions during expeditionary, joint, or combined operations.

== History ==
=== Early years ===
HMM-265 was commissioned on 1 October 1962 at Marine Corps Air Facility Jacksonville, North Carolina. Originally flying the UH-34, the squadron deployed to Memphis, Tennessee shortly after commissioning in support of the Mississippi Crisis, a critical moment in the American civil rights movement. Following that, HMM-265 began a series of deployments testing new helicopter tactics, such as the night raid.

On 30 June 1964 the squadron began accepting the first CH-46A Sea Knights in Fleet Marine Force service. To commemorate their new aircraft, HMM-265 unveiled a new insignia on 1 October 1964. This design, created by PFC Charles D. Lyles, was the official unit patch until 2007, when a new design was adopted, based on the Japanese Shinjitai for dragon. In June 1965 the squadron deployed to the Caribbean aboard the USS Okinawa. On 4 February 1966, HMM-265 became the first Marine Squadron to log 10,000 accident free hours in the CH-46A. The squadron had to address various technical teething problems including excessive rotor vibration and sand damage to the engines. In addition, as a result of combat experience in South Vietnam the helicopters had to be modified to mount machine guns on either side of the helicopter.

=== Vietnam War ===
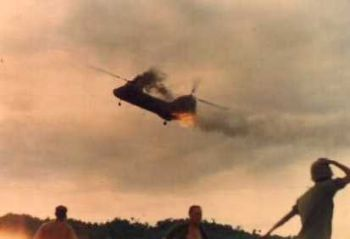
A squadron CH-46 trailing smoke and flame after being hit by anti-aircraft fire during Operation Hastings. The helicopter crashed and exploded upon impact, killing 13 Marines

On 21 April 1966, the squadron boarded USS Boxer in Norfolk, Virginia. On 22 May the squadron came ashore at Marble Mountain Air Facility (MMAF) located southeast of Da Nang Air Base, South Vietnam. The squadron had 22 CH-46As and was assigned to Marine Aircraft Group 16 (MAG-16), 1st Marine Aircraft Wing. Despite the earlier modifications the CH-46A experienced problems with sand damaging the engine compressors with the result that engines had to be replaced every 200-300 sorties, however by the end of August filters had been installed which remedied the issue. In early July the squadron supported Operation Macon. On 15 July 1966, during the first day of Operation Hastings, HMM-265 had two of its helicopters crash. The first crash was caused when a CH-46A struck a tree during the initial insert of Marines from 3rd Battalion, 4th Marines and the second occurred later that evening when aircraft EP-171 was hit at 1,500 feet (460 m) by 12.7 mm fire resulting in the death of 13 Marines. In November the squadron supported Operation Prairie.

On 12 July 1967, the squadron became the Special Landing Force (SLF) helicopter squadron embarked aboard the USS Tripoli. As the SLF squadron, they were tasked with conducting heliborne search and destroy missions against Viet Cong targets along the coast. During this time, five major operations were conducted: Bear Chain/Fremont, Beacon Guide, Kangaroo Kick, Beacon Gate and Cochise. On 23 August the squadron was assigned to Marine Aircraft Group 36 (MAG-36) at MMAF. On 16 October the squadron was transferred back to MAG-16. In late December the squadron supported Operation Auburn.

On 15 June 1968 a squadron detachment went onboard USS Valley Forge as the SLF Bravo helicopter squadron, with the entire squadron moving to USS Tripoli on 7 July. On 19 August the squadron return ashore from SLF duty and was assigned to MAG-16. On 30 September it was assigned to MAG-36. On 11 October, while supporting Operation Maui Peak, a UH-34D from HMM-362 flew into the bottom of a squadron CH-46 causing both to crash with no survivors.

The squadron resumed duties as the SLF squadron aboard USS Iwo Jima in late May 1969. They conducted amphibious raids in support of Operations Bold Pursuit (27 June – 6 July), Mighty Play (10-20 July) and finally Defiant Stand (7-18 September). After three years in Vietnam, the squadron was relocated to Marine Corps Air Station Santa Ana, California on 7 October leaving their helicopters with other in-country squadrons.

A total of 27 HMM-265 Marines perished in the war. HMM-265 was rebuilt using a few squadron personnel returned from Vietnam and the Marines of HMM-301. The squadron was deactivated on 13 November 1970.

=== Reactivation in 1977 ===
On 1 September 1977, the squadron was reactivated at Marine Corps Air Station Kaneohe Bay, Hawaii under the command of Lieutenant Colonel Donald Klingler, reestablishing a presence in the Pacific that continues to this day. On the day of reactivation, the squadron had no helicopters, and by December it was almost at a full strength of 4 CH-46Ds and 7 CH-46Fs.

In the spring of 1978, HMM-265 deployed to Kauai's Barking Sands training area to increase combat readiness in preparation for their upcoming Western Pacific deployment. While there, the squadron performed exercises in low terrain flying and troop transportation.

In April 1978, HMM-265 embarked onto USS New Orleans and departed for the Western Pacific in order to establish first-line-of-defense military presence during the Cold War era. The squadron was away from Kaneohe Marine Corps Air Station for six months, during which they completed a training exercises in Cebu, Philippines with additional port calls in Hong Kong and Singapore. The deployment strength for this mission was 12 CH-46s, 4 CH-53s, 2 UH-1Ns, and 2 AH-1Js.

After spending a year at home, HMM-265 began preparing for their next deployment by accomplishing a training exercise on the island of Kahoolawe. They spent the first weekend of August 1979 on the island conducting amphibious operations with the Battalion Landing Team, combining the AV-8A Harrier and helicopter operations and conducting exercises on board USS Tripoli.

In late August 1979, the squadron deployed again to the Western Pacific on USS Tripoli. Once again under the command of Lt. Col. Donald Klingler, the squadron deployed with the Marine Amphibious Unit (MAU) to combine with several additional MAUs to participate in Operation Fortress Gale in Okinawa. Following that, they participated in exercise Kangaroo Three in Northeastern Australia, a joint operation between the squadron, the New Zealand and the Australian military forces. They also visited New Guinea, Hong Kong, Tasmania and Sydney where they celebrated the Marine Corps birthday on 10 November 1979. The deployment strength during this assignment was 12 CH-46s, 4 CH-53s, 2 UH-1Ns, 2 AH-1Js, 2 AV-8As.

After the squadron returned home in early February 1980, the reins of the squadron were passed to Lt. Col. William Barba during a change of command ceremony on 22 February. The squadron continued to operate in and out of Kaneohe Bay and the Western Pacific.

HMM-265 (REIN) "Dragons" deployed aboard USS Tarawa as part of Task Group 76.3/Amphibious Ready Group Alfa/Amphibious Squadron Seven. HMM-265 was equipped with 12 CH-46D Sea Knight and were reinforced by detachments from HMH-463 and 4 CH-53D Sea Stallions, HMA-169 with 4 AH-1T Sea Cobra / 2 UH-1N Hueys from MCAS Camp Pendleton, California and VMA-513 with 6 AV-8A Harriers based out of MCAS Yuma, Arizona. After boarding USS Tarawa, Amphibious Squadron Seven left San Diego on from 14 October 1980, visiting Subic Bay, Philippines and participating in exercises Valiant Blitz in the Philippines, Amphibious Squadron Seven spent almost a week at Pattaya Beach, from 22 to 27 December, before moving on to Singapore where she arrived on the 30th. After operations in Diego Garcia where Amphibious Squadron Seven's embarked marines carried out a landing exercise between 28 and 30 January, they headed south east for exercise Valiant Usher 81-3 off Lancelin, Western Australia with units of the Australian Military. After Valiant Usher off Western Australia, VMA-513 and Amphibious Squadron One conducted an R&R visit to Perth/Fremantle, Western Australia from 8–13 February 1981. The squadron later took part in exercises Team Spirit 81 and Valiant Flex 81–2 at Busan South Korea. HMM-265 (REIN) arrived back at MCAS Kaneohe Bay, Hawaii before or about 16 April 1981 with the detachments arriving home shortly after.

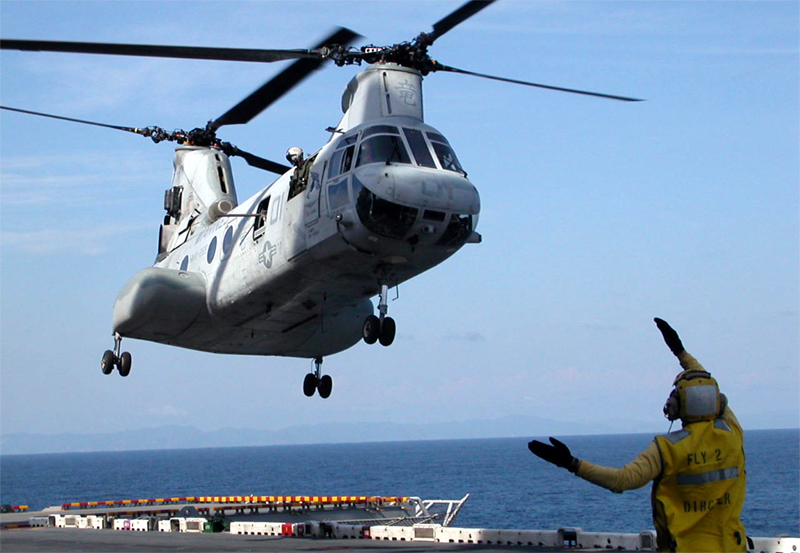
CH-46 of HMM-265 lands on the deck of USS Essex in January 2004

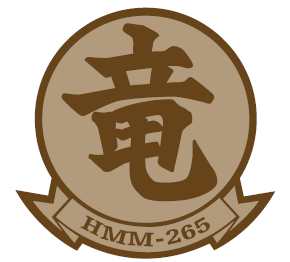
HMM-265 old squadron patch

=== Gulf War & the 1990s ===
In 1990 and 1991 the squadron was attached to the 5th Marine Expeditionary Brigade, Marine Air Group 50. During Operation Desert Shield, they took part in Operation Sea Soldier IV the largest troop lift ever in Marine Corps history in the country of Oman. The squadron then waited on amphibious shipping in the Persian Gulf awaiting the start of combat operations. The squadron was part of the 5th Marine Expeditionary Brigade's amphibious feint into Kuwait, which succeeded in drawing the attention of Saddam Hussein's forces away from the actual attack that occurred inland.

Upon conclusion of hostilities in the Persian Gulf region, the squadron returned to Hawaii. While en route, they were called upon to provide humanitarian assistance and disaster relief to the country of Bangladesh during Operation Sea Angel. During the operation they flew 770 hours in ten days.

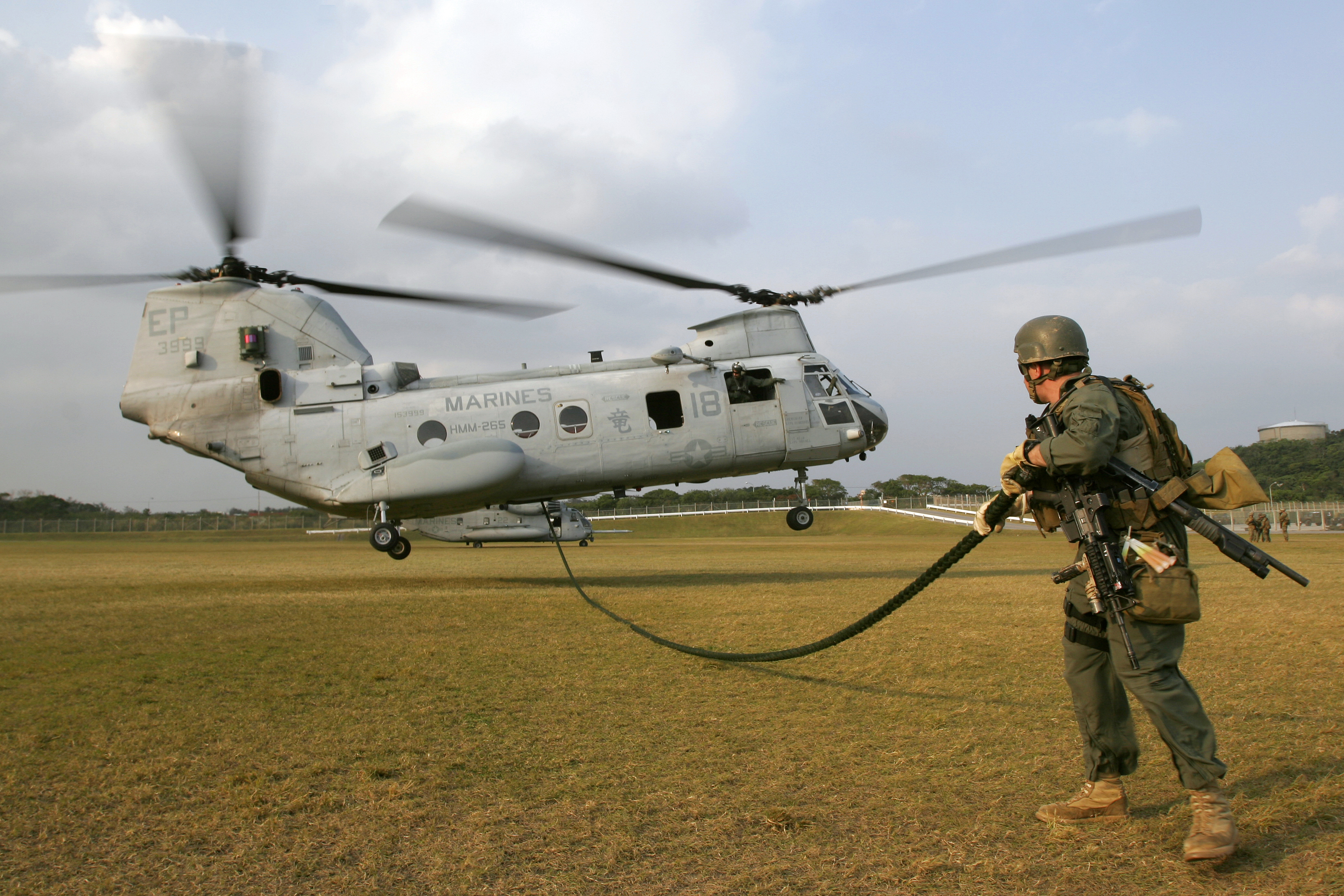
A CH-46E from HMM-265 training at Camp Hansen on Okinawa on January 31, 2007.

The squadron had little time to rest before deploying to Okinawa in October 1991. During this deployment the Dragons provided support to HMX-1 for the Presidential visit to Tokyo. The squadron was then called to Cambodia in support of Operation Full Accounting in 1992, where they assisted in the recovery of remains of U.S. servicemen lost during the Vietnam War. The squadron was relocated entirely to Marine Corps Air Station Futenma, Okinawa, Japan in early 1995.

Heightened tensions in the Persian Gulf during the fall of 1998 brought the squadron back on a no-notice deployment as the Aviation Combat Element (ACE) for the 31st Marine Expeditionary Unit. They participated in Operation Desert Fox in the Persian Gulf and Kuwait from November 1998 through February 1999. When the squadron returned, they had a short break before deploying again. This time, the Marines helped end the civil war on East Timor during Operation Stabilise in October 1999 and again during January and February 2000.

=== Global War on Terror ===
Deployed in support of Operation Iraqi Freedom operating from Al Asad Airbase, Al-Qa'im, and Korean Village from October 2004 to February 2005.

=== Losses ===
On 5 August 2017 a squadron MV-22 Osprey crashed in Shoalwater Bay on the east coast of Australia after taking off from the amphibious assault ship USS Bonhomme Richard. 23 personnel were rescued, while three were confirmed dead.

=== 2026 Iran war ===
HMM-265 is reportedly one of the embarked squadron onboard USS Tripoli on its deployment to Middle East during the 2026 Iran war.

== Awards ==
- Tiltrotor Squadron of the Year for 2013 and 2023.
- Marine Corps Aviation Association's Squadron of the Year for 1992, 1999, 2000 and 2009.
- Chief of Naval Operations Safety Award for the years 1978, ‘79, ‘84, ‘94, ‘95, ‘96, ‘97, and 2009.
- The squadron surpassed 60,000 mishap free flight hours in the fall of 2003.

== Gallery ==
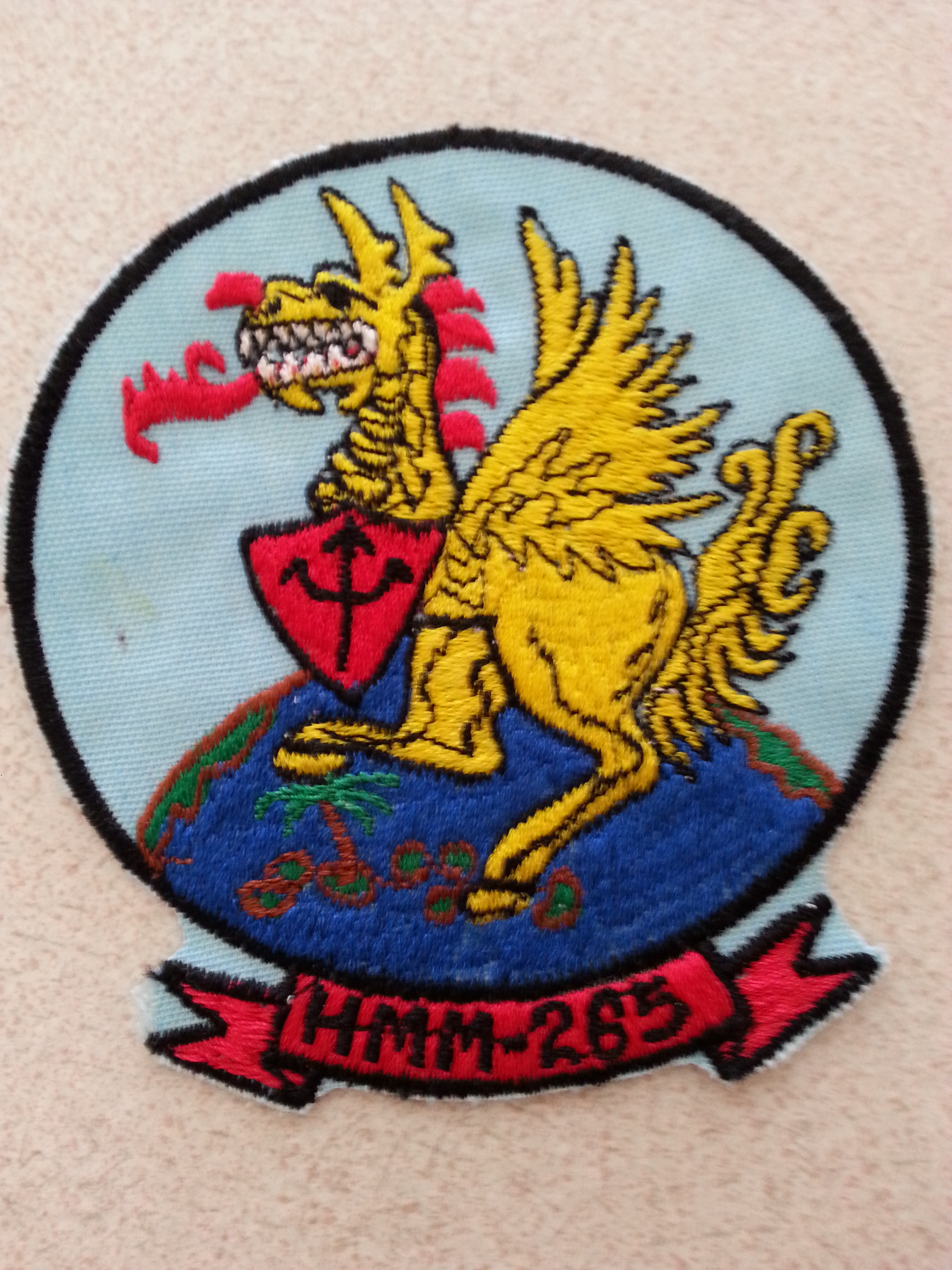
HMM-265 Squadron Insignia 1977

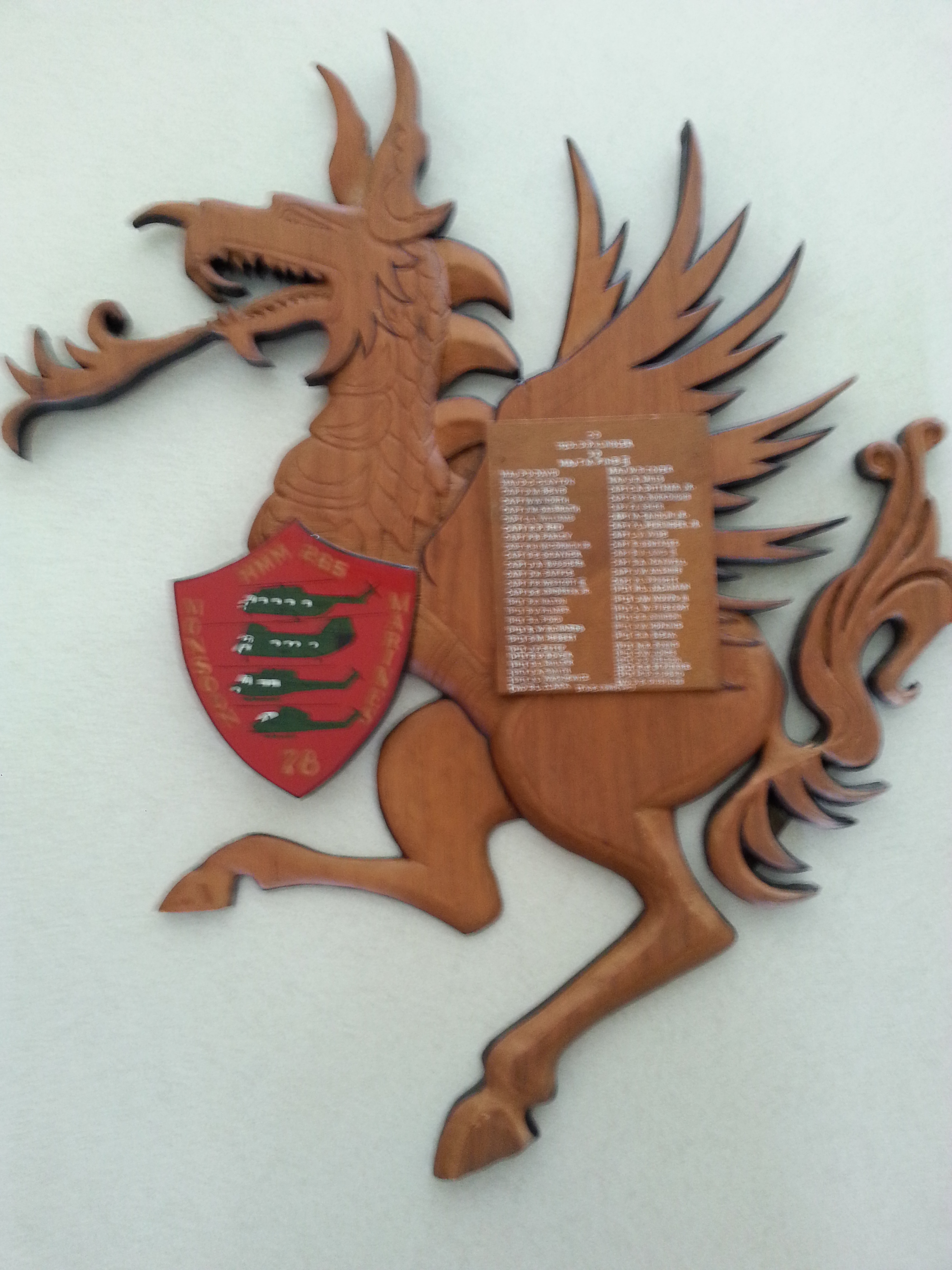
HMM-265 Squadron Plaque 1977

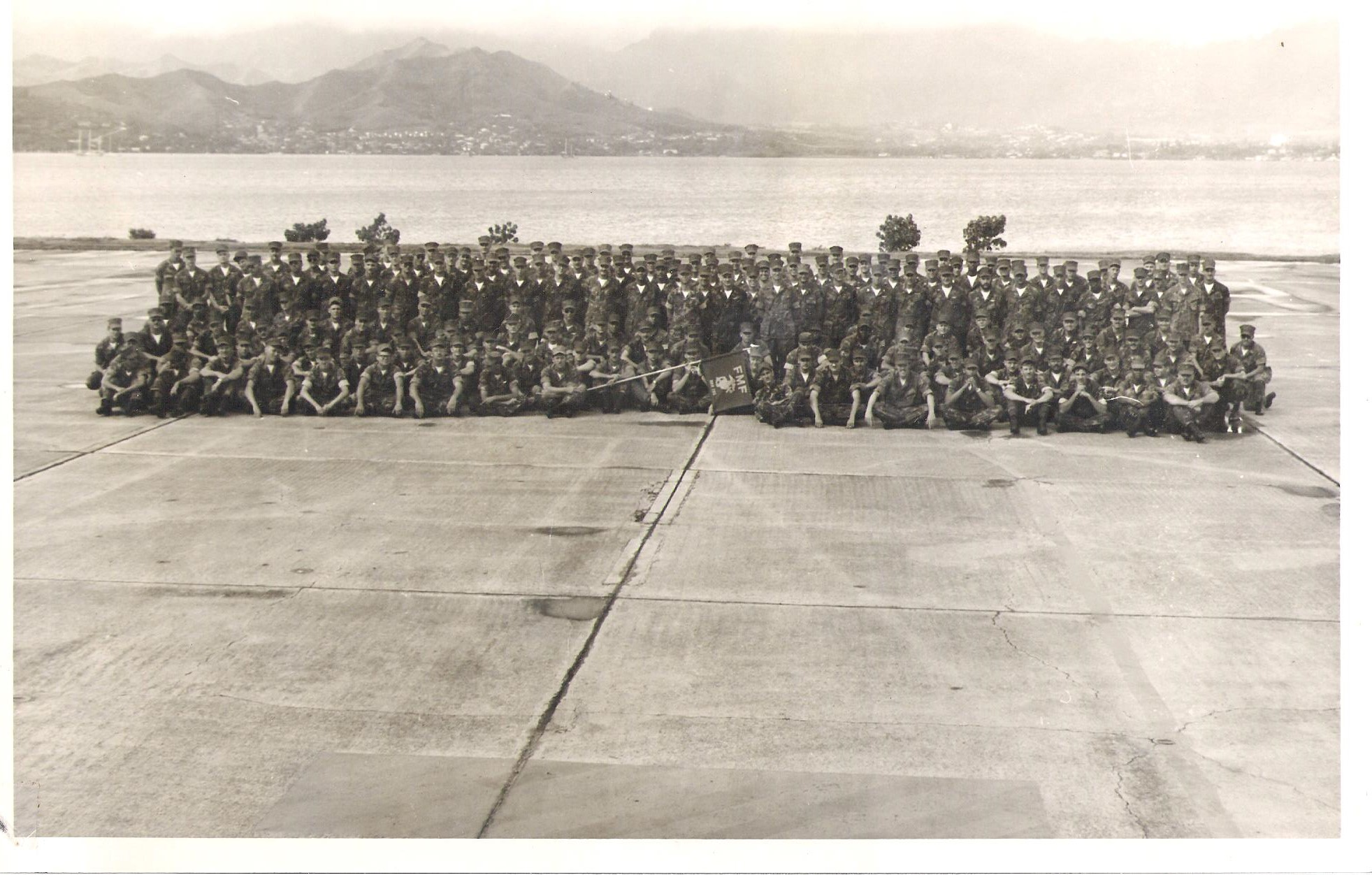
HMM-265 Squadron Group Photo 1977

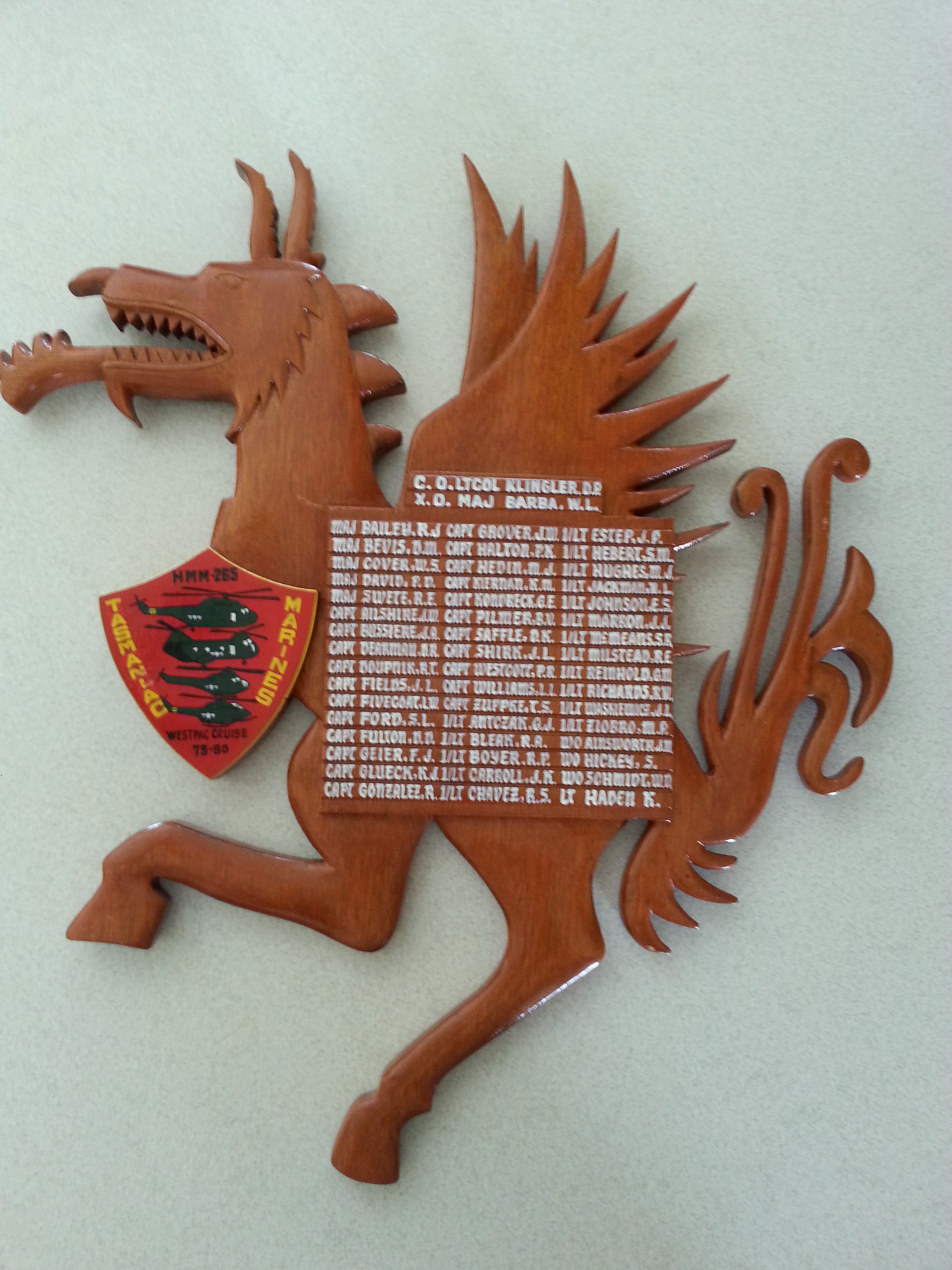
HMM-265 Squadron Plaque 1979

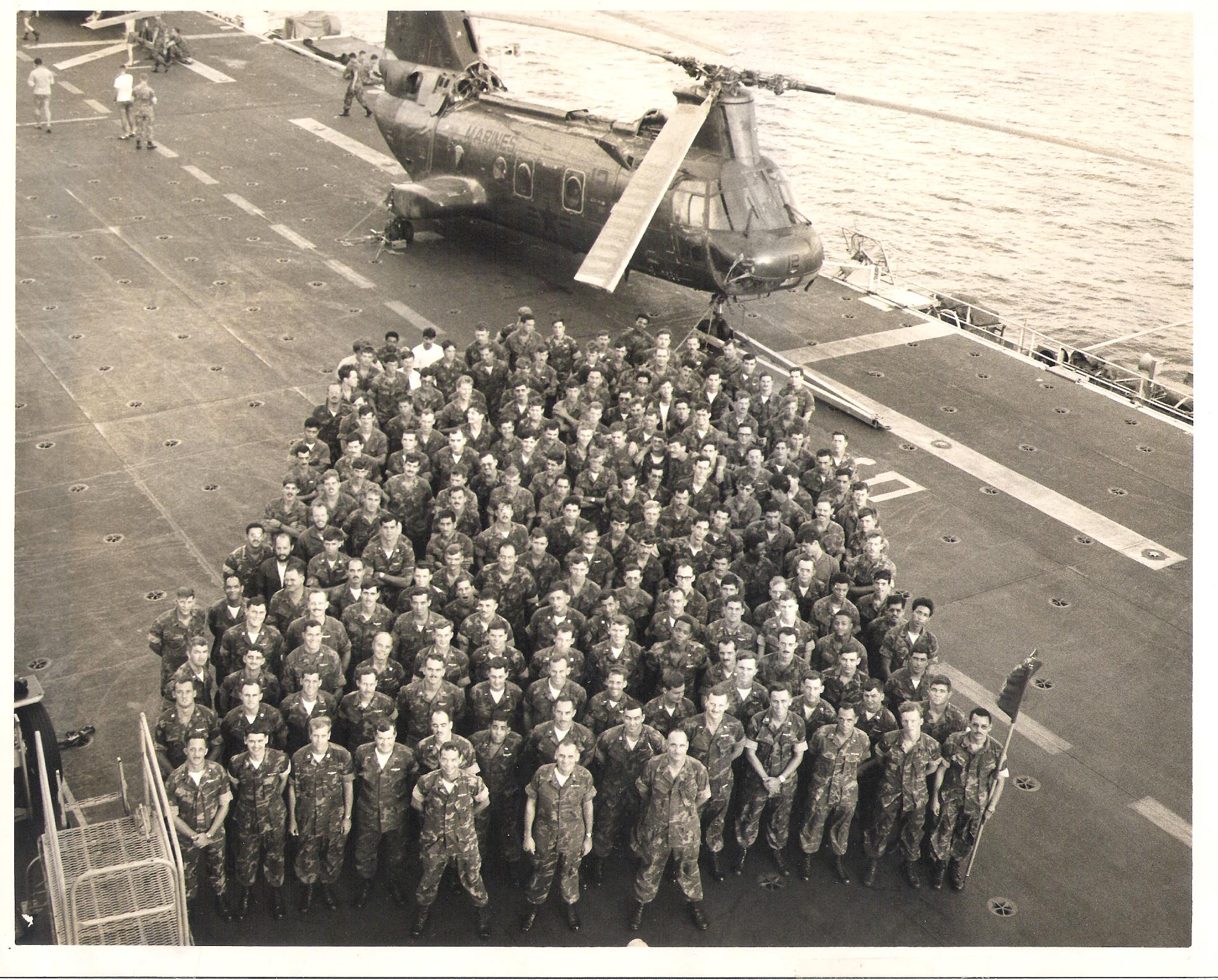
HMM-265 Group Squadron Photo 1979

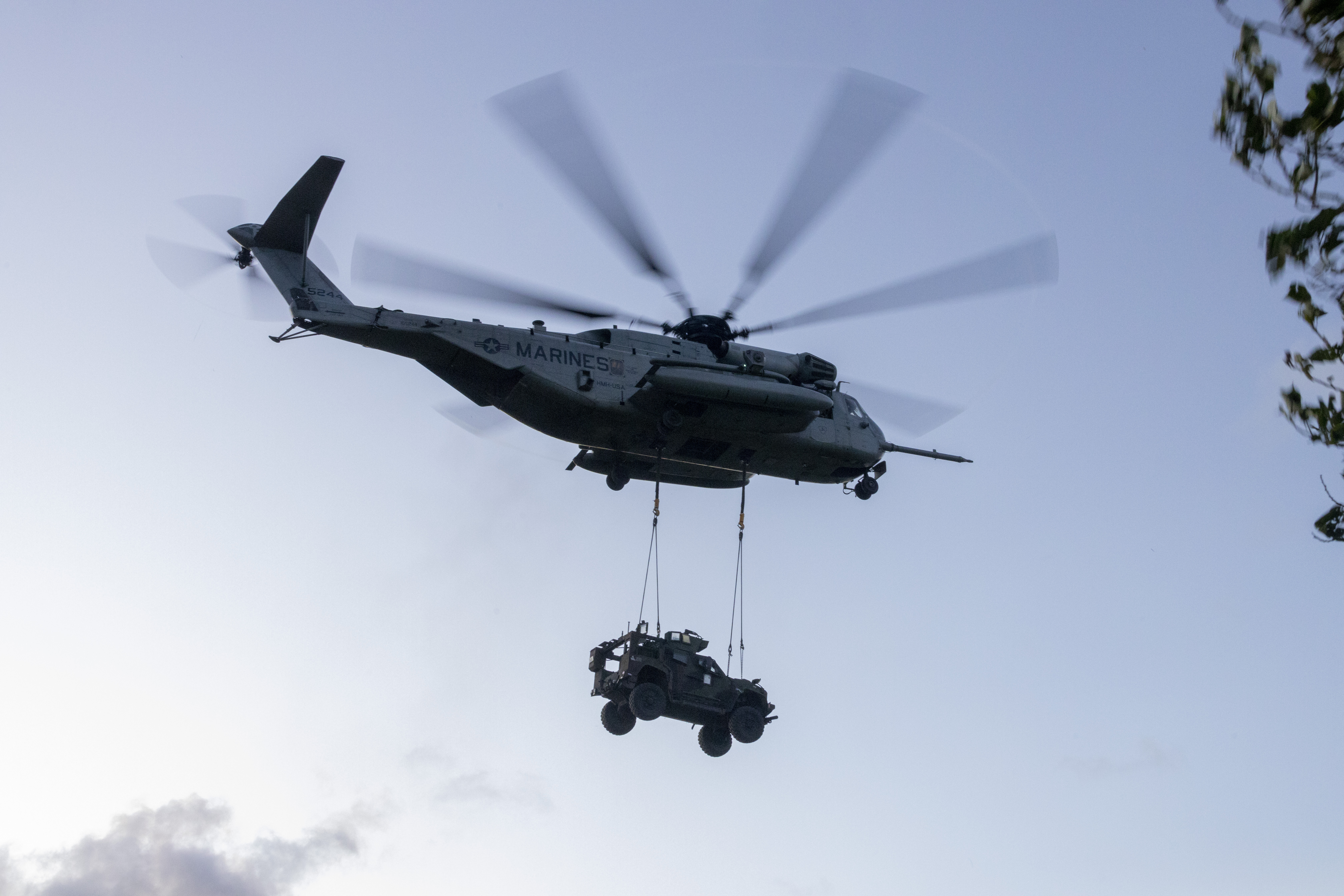
A VMM-265 CH-53E hoists a Joint Light Tactical Vehicle
