= Richard Pittman =

Richard Pittman may refer to:

- Richard A. Pittman (1945–2016), U.S. Marine and Medal of Honor recipient
- Richard Pittman (boxer) (born 1957), Cook Islands boxer

== See also ==
- Richard Pitman, British jockey
