= John J. McGinty III =

Marine Corps Medal of Honor recipient (1940–2014)

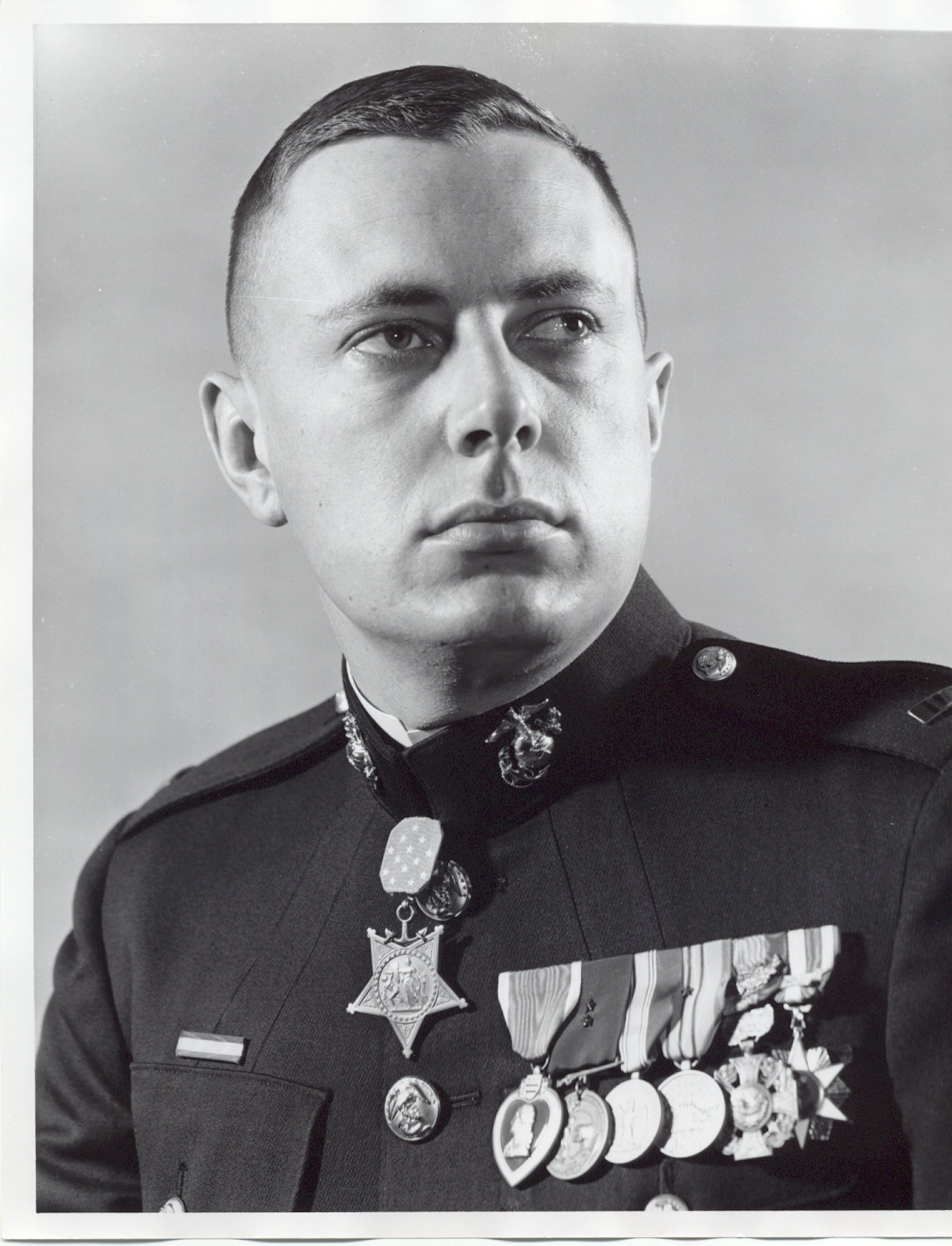
- John J. McGinty, III, Medal of Honor recipient
- Born: John James McGinty III; January 21, 1940; Boston, Massachusetts, U.S.
- Died: January 17, 2014 (aged 73); Beaufort, South Carolina, U.S.
- Burial place: Beaufort National Cemetery, Beaufort, South Carolina
- Military career
- Allegiance: United States
- Branch: United States Marine Corps
- Service years: 1957 - 1976
- Rank: Captain
- Units: 3rd Battalion, 4th Marines
- Conflicts: Vietnam War
- Awards: Medal of Honor; Purple Heart

Captain John James McGinty III (January 21, 1940 – January 17, 2014) was a United States Marine Corps officer who received the United States militaries' highest decoration — the Medal of Honor — for heroism during July 1966 in the Vietnam War.

== Early life and education ==
John McGinty was born on January 21, 1940, in Boston, Massachusetts. He completed grammar school in Louisville, Kentucky in 1955, and attended high school in Louisville for a year and a half prior to enlisting in the United States Marine Corps Reserve on February 19, 1957.

== Military service ==
Upon Discharging from the Marine Corps Reserve, he enlisted in the Marine Corps as active duty on March 3, 1958.

He completed recruit training with the 3rd Recruit Training Battalion, Marine Corps Recruit Depot Parris Island, South Carolina. He then went to advanced infantry combat training with Company M, 3rd Battalion, 1st Infantry Training Regiment, Camp Lejeune, North Carolina. He was promoted to private first class in September 1957, and was transferred to the 7th Infantry Company, USMCR, Louisville, Kentucky, to serve as a rifleman until March 1958.

Private First Class McGinty completed the Noncommissioned Officers Leadership School, Camp Pendleton, California in May 1958. He was then ordered to Marine Barracks, U.S. Naval Station, Kodiak, Alaska until May 1959. While stationed in Alaska, he was promoted to Corporal in September 1958.

Transferred to the 1st Marine Division in June 1959, he saw duty as a rifleman leader, and later, squad leader with Company I, 3rd Battalion, 5th Marines. Upon his return to the United States, he served as Guard/Company Police Sergeant, H&S Battalion, FMF, Atlantic, at Norfolk, Virginia, until March 1962.

From there, he was ordered to Marine Corps Recruit Depot, Parris Island, South Carolina, and assigned duty as Drill Instructor, 2nd Recruit Training Battalion. He was promoted to Sergeant in August 1962.

From November 1964 until December 1965, Sgt McGinty saw duty as Assistant Brig Warden, Marine Barracks, U.S. Naval Base, Norfolk, Virginia.

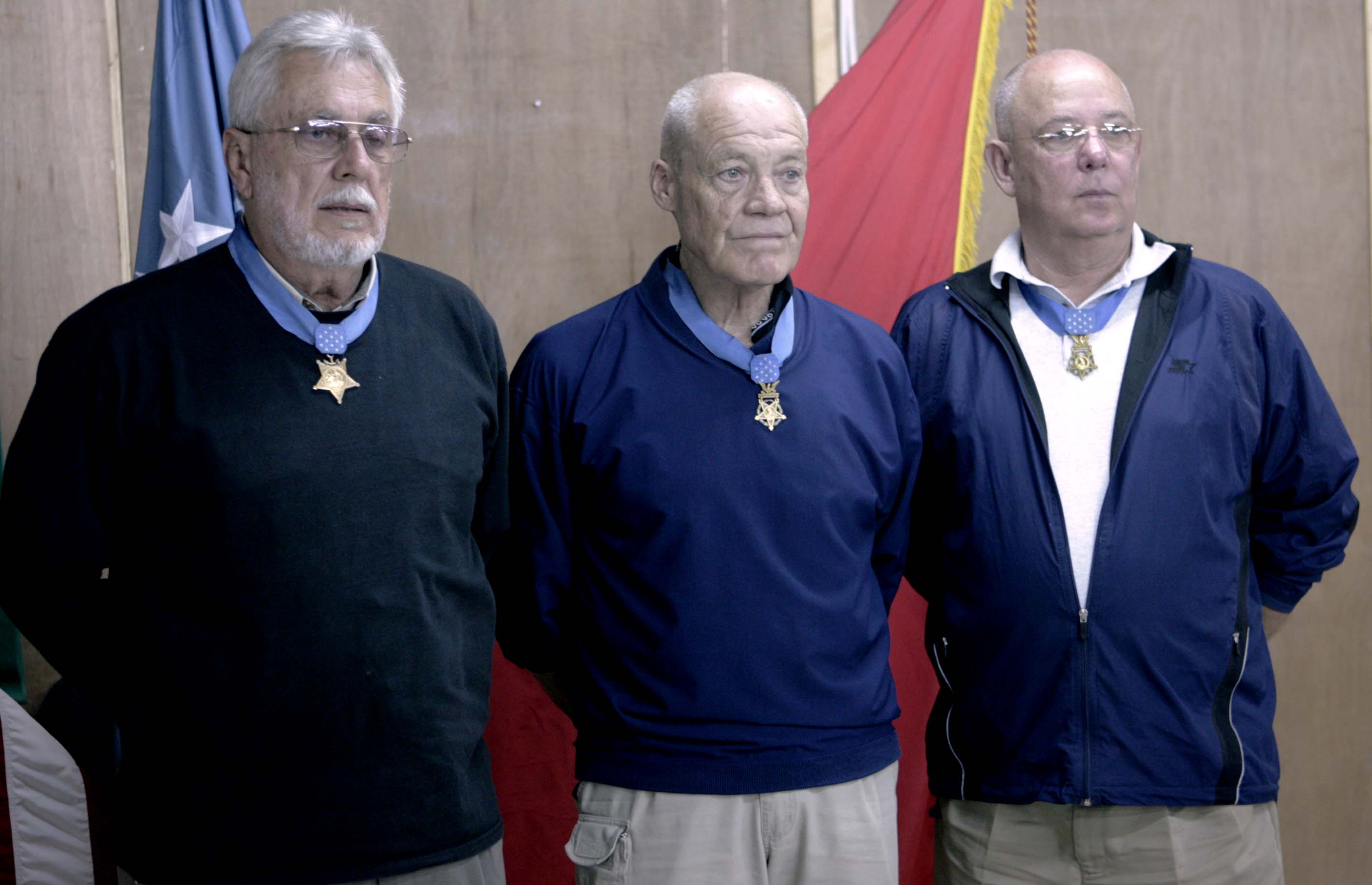
Capt McGinty (left), along with Army Medal of Honor recipients COL Robert L. Howard and CSM Gary L. Littrell at Camp Taqaddum, Iraq on November 11, 2006.

Sergeant McGinty was ordered to the West Coast for transfer to the Far East. Joining the 4th Marines, 3rd Marine Division, in the Republic of Vietnam in April 1966, he served successively as a platoon sergeant and platoon commander, Company K, 3rd Battalion, as S-2 Officer and Operation Chief, H&S Company, 3rd Battalion, and as Operations Chief, with Headquarters Company, 4th Marines. It was in 1966, during Operation Hastings, that McGinty distinguished himself in the actions for which he was awarded the Medal of Honor.

Upon his return to the United States in May 1967, he reported to the Marine Corps Recruit Depot, Parris Island, South Carolina. He served as a drill instructor until his promotion to second lieutenant on August 8, 1967. The following day, he assumed his assignment as Series Officer, 1st Recruit Battalion, at the Recruit Depot, Parris Island.

On March 12, 1968, President Lyndon Johnson presented the Medal of Honor to 2ndLt McGinty in a ceremony at the White House in which fellow Marine Robert J. Modrzejewski was also honored.

Captain McGinty retired from the Marine Corps in October 1976.

== Later life ==
In the 1980s McGinty felt that there was a conflict between wearing his Medal of Honor (which bears the image of the Roman goddess Minerva) and his new-found Christian faith. Some news agencies reported that McGinty wanted to return his Medal of Honor.

McGinty died at his home in Beaufort, South Carolina on January 17, 2014. The cause was bone cancer. He was buried at Beaufort National Cemetery.

== Pistol stolen and later returned ==
McGinty's USMC M1911 pistol, mentioned in his Medal of Honor citation, was stolen from a display in 1978. In 2011, history buff George Berry purchased the pistol from an auction. Curious about the name engraved on the pistol, Berry contacted McGinty and subsequently returned the pistol to its rightful owner. McGinty sent back another M1911 pistol previously owned by the late Medal of Honor recipient John William Finn along with a Medal of Honor challenge coin in gratitude.

== Awards and decorations ==
A complete list of his medals and decorations includes: the Medal of Honor, the Purple Heart, the Good Conduct Medal with two bronze stars, the Combat Action Ribbon, the Presidential Unit Citation, the National Defense Service Medal, the Vietnam Service Medal with two bronze stars, the Vietnamese Cross of Gallantry with Palm, and the Republic of Vietnam Campaign Medal.

1st Row	Medal of Honor	Purple Heart	Combat Action Ribbon
2nd Row	Presidential Unit Citation	Marine Corps Good Conduct Medal with two bronze stars	National Defense Service Medal
3rd Row	Vietnam Service Medal with two bronze stars	Vietnam Gallantry Cross with Palm	Republic of Vietnam Campaign Medal

== Medal of Honor citation ==
The official Medal of Honor citation reads:

For conspicuous gallantry and intrepidity at the risk of his life above and beyond the call of duty as Acting Platoon Leader, First Platoon, Company K, Third Battalion, Fourth Marines, Third Marine Division, in the Republic of Vietnam on 18 July 1966. Second Lieutenant (then Staff Sergeant) John McGinty's platoon, which was providing rear security to protect the withdrawal of the battalion from a position which had been under attack for three days, came under heavy small arms, automatic weapons and mortar fire from an estimated enemy regiment. With each successive human wave which assaulted his thirty-two-man platoon during the four- hour battle, Second Lieutenant John McGinty rallied his men to beat off the enemy. In one bitter assault, two of the squads became separated from the remainder of the platoon. With complete disregard for his safety, Second Lieutenant John McGinty charged through intense automatic weapons and mortar fire to their position. Finding twenty men wounded and the medical corpsmen killed, he quickly reloaded ammunition magazines and weapons for the wounded men and directed their fire upon the enemy. Although he was painfully wounded as he moved to care for the disabled men, he continued to shout encouragement to his troops and to direct their fire so effectively that the attacking hordes were beaten off. When the enemy tried to out flank his position, he killed five of them at point-blank range with his pistol. When they again seemed on the verge of overrunning the small force, he skillfully adjusted artillery and air strikes within fifty yards of his position. This destructive fire power routed the enemy, who left an estimated 500 bodies on the battlefield. Second Lieutenant John McGinty's personal heroism, indomitable leadership, selfless devotion to duty, and bold fighting spirit inspired his men to resist the repeated attacks by a fanatical enemy, reflected great credit upon himself, and upheld the highest traditions of the Marine Corps and the United States Naval Service.

== Honors ==
On May 19, 2004, the South Carolina General Assembly passed Bill 5281, a resolution "commend[ing] the extraordinary heroism of Marine Staff Sergeant John J. McGinty III, a native of Massachusetts who entered the service in South Carolina, and who was awarded the Medal of Honor during the Vietnam Conflict for Valor."

== See also ==
- List of Medal of Honor recipients for the Vietnam War
