= Donald E. Ballard =

United States Navy Medal of Honor recipient

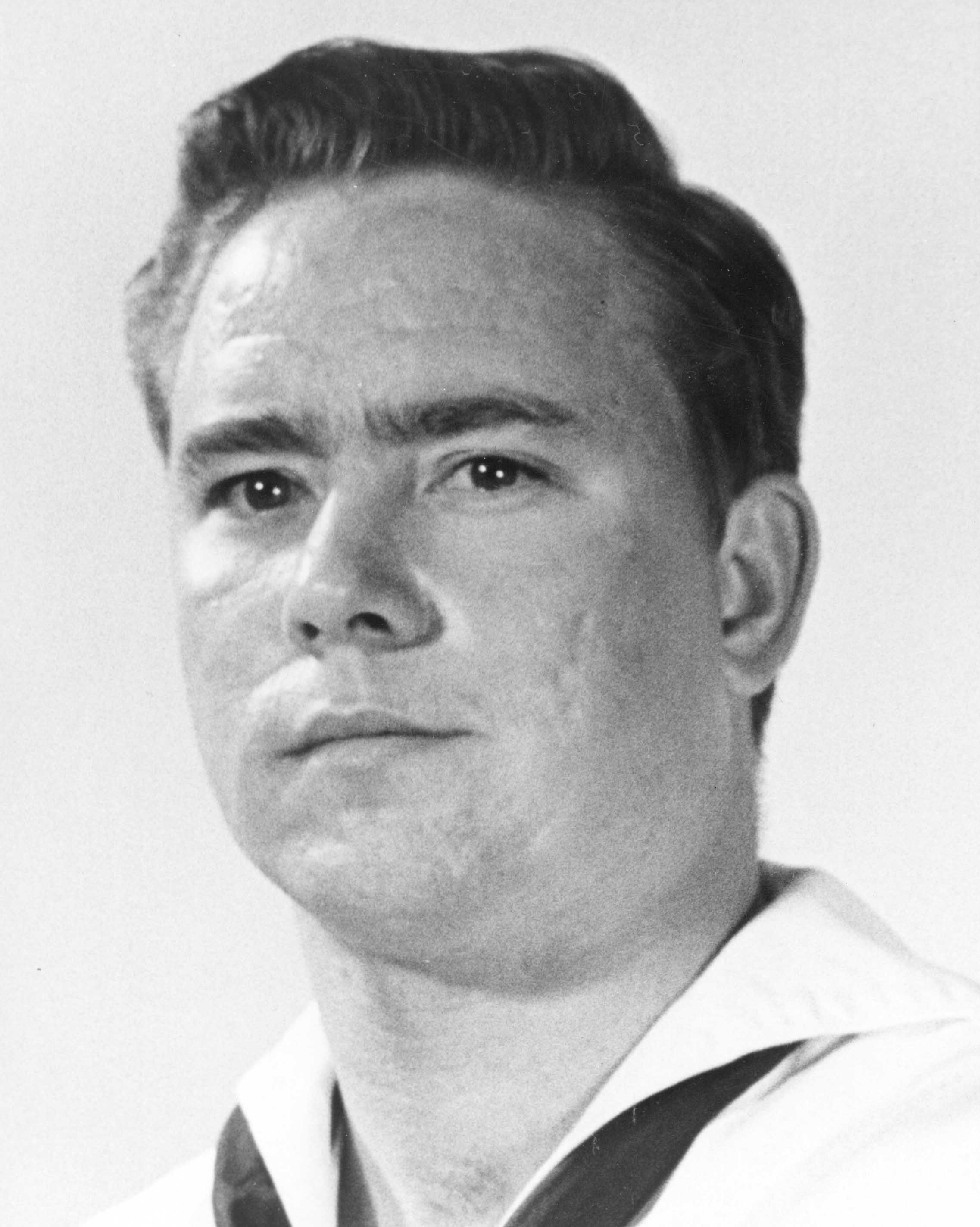
- Born: December 5, 1945 (age 80); Kansas City, Missouri
- Spouse: Virginia (Garvey) Ballard
- Military career
- Allegiance: United States
- Branch: United States Navy (1965–1970); Kansas National Guard (1970–2000)
- Service years: 1965–2000
- Rank: Colonel
- Nickname: "Doc"
- Units: M Company, 3rd Battalion 4th Marines
- Conflicts: Vietnam War
- Awards: Medal of Honor; Purple Heart (3)

Donald Everett Ballard (born December 5, 1945) is a retired colonel of the Kansas National Guard and former member of the United States Navy. As a hospital corpsman in the Vietnam War, he received the Medal of Honor for his heroic actions on May 16, 1968.

== Early life ==
Ballard was born in Kansas City, Missouri. He was married and was working in a dental lab when he decided to join the Navy in hopes of becoming a dentist someday.

== United States Navy ==
Ballard enlisted in the United States Navy in 1965. After he completed navy recruit training and Hospital Corps School, he decided that he wanted to serve as a hospital corpsman with the United States Marine Corps and was sent to a Field Medical Service School. After he completed the course there, he was sent to Vietnam in 1967. Ballard was assigned as a navy corpsman with M Company, 3rd Battalion, 4th Marine Regiment, 3rd Marine Division in Quang Tri province, in South Vietnam.

On May 16, 1968, Ballard treated two Marines suffering from heat exhaustion, and when returning to his platoon from the casualty evacuation helicopter pad, his rifle company was attacked by a unit of North Vietnamese Army (NVA) soldiers. While under enemy fire, Ballard was attending to a wounded Marine when an enemy grenade landed near the wounded Marine, four other Marines, and himself. He immediately covered the grenade with his body to shield the five Marines from the blast. Realizing that the grenade failed to explode, he quickly threw it out of harm's way as it exploded, saving the Marines and himself from harm or death. He then continued on attending to wounded Marines during the firefight. For his actions, he received the United States of America's highest military decoration for valor, the Medal of Honor.

After having left the navy the previous year, Ballard received the Medal of Honor from President Richard M. Nixon and General William Westmoreland in 1970.

== United States Army ==
=== Kansas Army National Guard ===
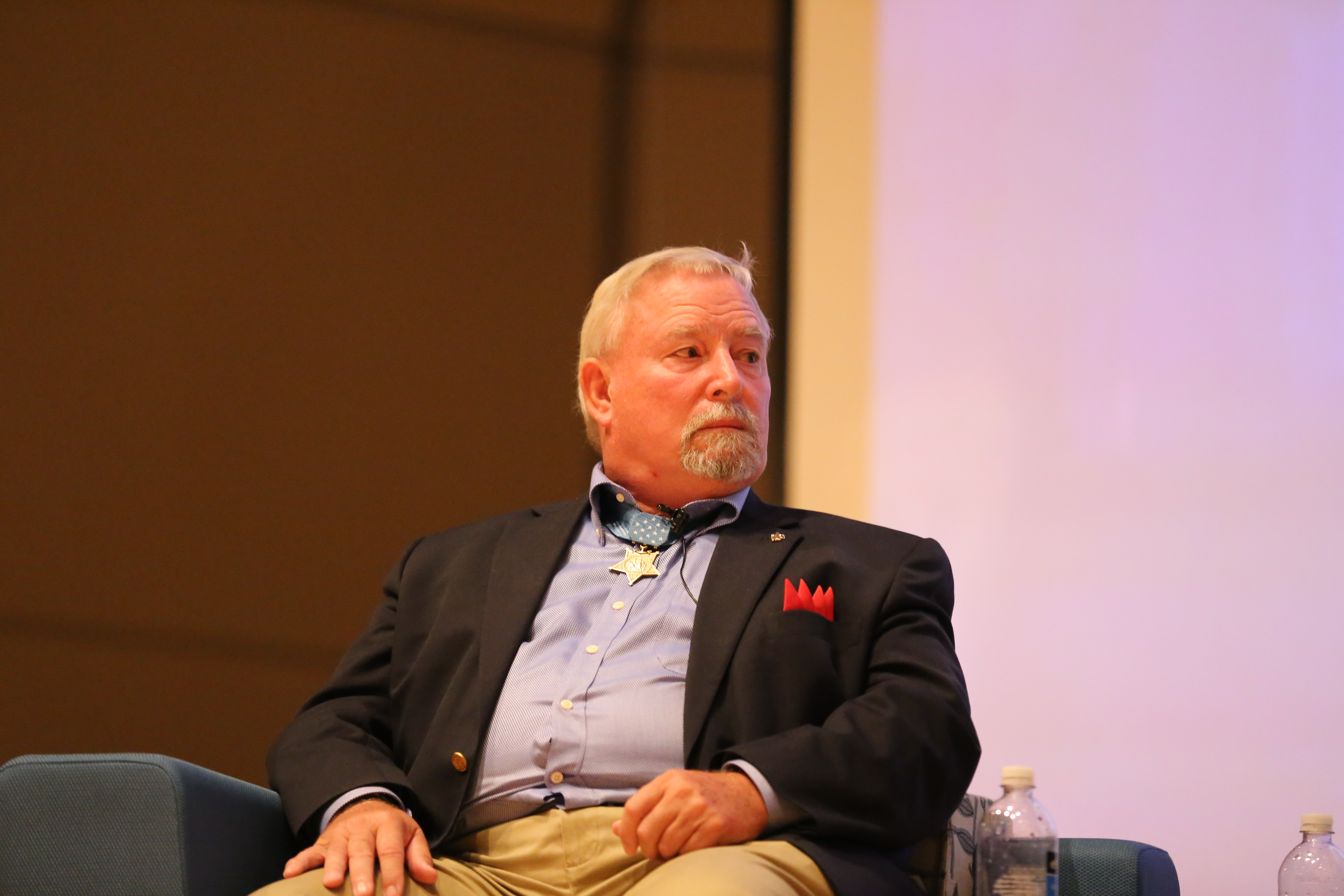
Ballard in 2014

Ballard was selected for the United States Army's Officer Candidate School. General Westmoreland found out Ballard was switching over to the Army and offered him a direct commission to be an active duty army officer, however Ballard turned it down for personal reasons. Ballard later joined the Kansas National Guard in 1970, and served as an ambulance platoon leader, company commander, and was tasked with creating the new Medical Detachment 5, a unit which performs medicals on guard members in order to save the cost of contracting outside medical help, and of which he was the first member and commander.

On April 5, 1998, Ballard was promoted to colonel by Major General James F. Reuger and served as Special Assistant to the Adjutant General until his retirement in 2000. Inducted into the National Guard Hall of Fame in November 2001, Ballard is the only living Kansas Guardsman to have received the Medal of Honor. He is also the subject of a memorial statue at the National Medical War Memorial in Kansas City, depicting Ballard during the action for which he received the Medal of Honor.

Ballard has been active in providing services to veterans and active duty military, including work towards opening a USO facility in downtown Kansas City.

== Military awards ==
Ballard's military awards and decorations include:

| Medal of Honor | Purple Heart Medal w/ two 5/16" Gold Stars | Navy Combat Action Ribbon |
| Navy Good Conduct Medal | National Defense Service Medal | Vietnam Service Medal w/ FMF Combat Operation Insignia and two 3/16" bronze stars |
| Republic of Vietnam Meritorious Unit Citation (Gallantry Cross) w/ Palm and Frame | Republic of Vietnam Meritorious Unit Citation (Civil Actions) w/ Palm and Frame | Republic of Vietnam Campaign Medal w/ 1960– device |

=== Medal of Honor citation ===
Ballard's official Medal of Honor citation reads:

The President of the United States in the name of The Congress takes pride in presenting the MEDAL OF HONOR to

HOSPITAL CORPSMAN SECOND CLASS DONALD EVERETT BALLARD
UNITED STATES NAVY

for service as set forth in the following

CITATION:

For conspicuous gallantry and intrepidity at the risk of his life and beyond the call of duty while serving as a HC2c. with Company M, in connection with operations against enemy aggressor forces. During the afternoon hours, Company M was moving to join the remainder of the 3d Battalion in Quang Tri Province. After treating and evacuating 2 heat casualties, HC2c. Ballard was returning to his platoon from the evacuation landing zone when the company was ambushed by a North Vietnamese Army unit employing automatic weapons and mortars, and sustained numerous casualties. Observing a wounded marine, HC2c. Ballard unhesitatingly moved across the fire swept terrain to the injured man and swiftly rendered medical assistance to his comrade. HC2c. Ballard then directed 4 marines to carry the casualty to a position of relative safety. As the 4 men prepared to move the wounded marine, an enemy soldier suddenly left his concealed position and, after hurling a hand grenade which landed near the casualty, commenced firing upon the small group of men. Instantly shouting a warning to the marines, HC2c. Ballard fearlessly threw himself upon the lethal explosive device to protect his comrades from the deadly blast. When the grenade failed to detonate, he calmly arose from his dangerous position and resolutely continued his determined efforts in treating other marine casualties. HC2c. Ballard's heroic actions and selfless concern for the welfare of his companions served to inspire all who observed him and prevented possible injury or death to his fellow marines. His courage, daring initiative, and unwavering devotion to duty in the face of extreme personal danger, sustain and enhance the finest traditions of the U.S. Naval Service.

/S/ RICHARD M. NIXON

== See also ==
- List of Medal of Honor recipients for the Vietnam War
