= Operation Hastings =

1966 battle of the Vietnam War

- Part of the Vietnam War
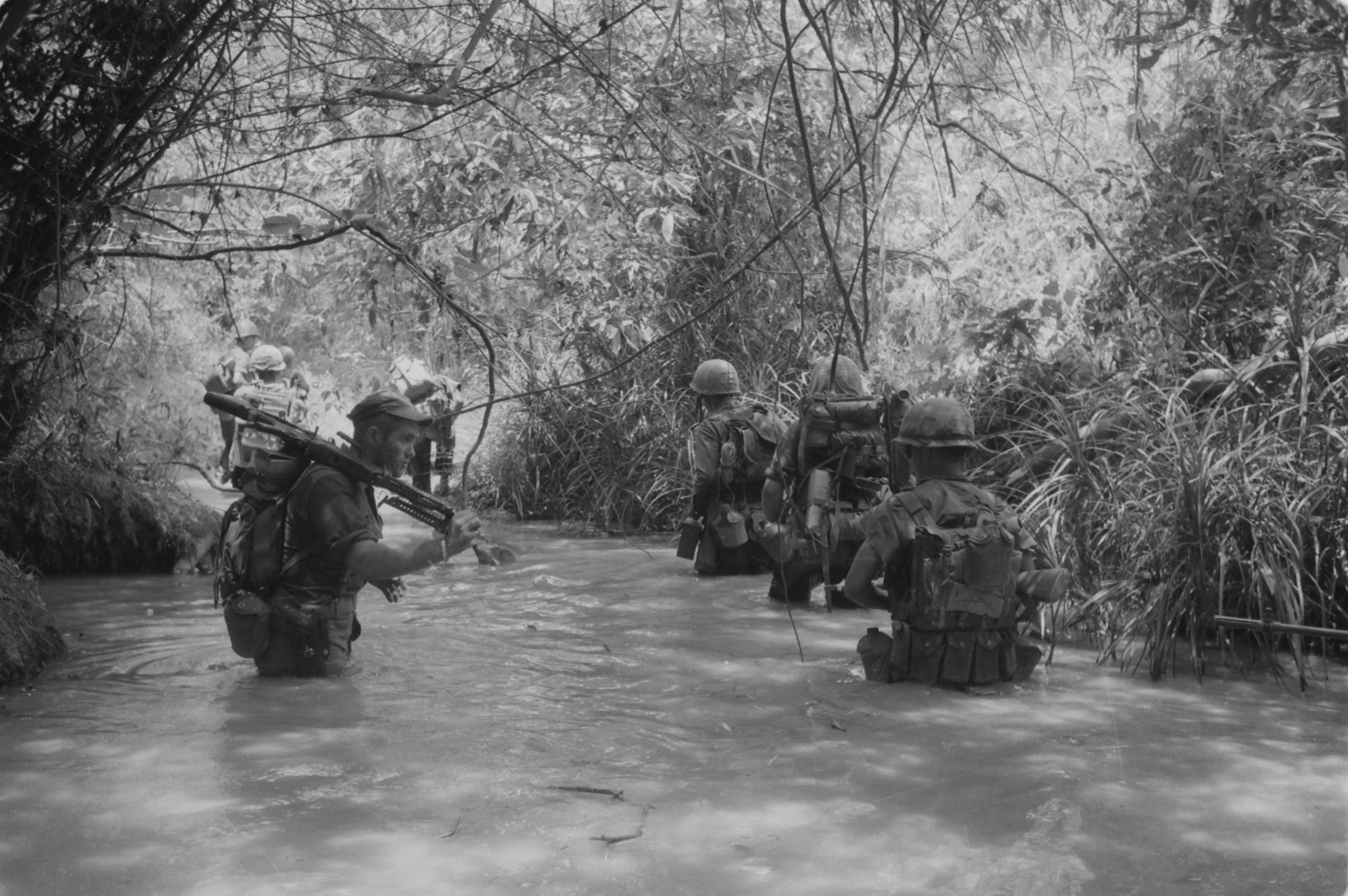
- Marines of Company H, 2/4th Marines take to the water as they move to join up with other elements of their battalion
Date	15 July - 3 August 1966
Location	Vietnamese Demilitarized Zone
Result	South Vietnamese and U.S. victory

Belligerents
United States; South Vietnam	North Vietnam

Commanders and leaders
(United States) Lewis W. Walt (United States) Wood B. Kyle (United States) Lowell English (South Vietnam) Ngo Quang Truong	(North Vietnam) Chu Phương Đới

Units involved
3rd Marine Division; 1st Infantry Division	(North Vietnam) 324-B Division

Strength
8,000; 3,000	8,000 to 10,000

Casualties and losses
126 killed; 21 killed	~700 killed; 17 captured

Operation Hastings was an American military operation in the Vietnam War. The operation was a qualified success in that it pushed the People's Army of Vietnam (PAVN) forces back across the Demilitarized Zone (DMZ). As the PAVN's activities violated the demilitarized nature of the DMZ, U.S. military leadership ordered a steady build-up of U.S. Marines near the DMZ from 1966 to 1968.

== Background ==
During late June and early July 1966, Marine reconnaissance units operating south of the DMZ had observed and engaged increased numbers of uniformed regular PAVN troops. On 6 July, troops of the Army of the Republic of Vietnam (ARVN) 1st Division captured a PAVN soldier near the Rockpile who identified himself as being from the 812th Regiment of the 324B Division and advised that the other regiments of the division had also moved into South Vietnam. On 9 July a lieutenant from the 812th Regiment surrendered in the same area and advised that the 324B Division's mission was to "liberate" Quang Tri Province.

== Prelude ==
Convinced that the PAVN had moved across the DMZ in force, Major General Wood B. Kyle, commanding general of the 3rd Marine Division, recommended to General Lew Walt that the U.S. launch an operation to drive back the PAVN. Walt passed on this recommendation to COMUSMACV, General William Westmoreland, who gave his approval. On 11 July Brigadier General Lowell English, assistant division commander of the 3rd Marine Division, met with General Ngô Quang Trưởng, commanding general of the ARVN 1st Division, and Colonel Sherman, commander of the 4th Marines, at the 1st Division HQ in Huế to plan the operation. It was decided that a Marine task force would move into the area south of the DMZ to participate in Operation Hastings (the name given to Marine DMZ reconnaissance operations on 7 July), while ARVN forces would launch Operation Lam Son 289 south of the Marines.

On 13 July Task Force Delta became operational under the command of English with Sherman as chief of staff. The task force consisted of four infantry battalions, 2nd Battalion 1st Marines, 1st Battalion 3rd Marines, 2nd Battalion 4th Marines and 3rd Battalion 4th Marines, one artillery battalion, 3rd Battalion 12th Marines, and various supporting forces. English established his command post at Cam Lộ.

Intelligence determined that the PAVN 90th Regiment with an estimated strength of 1,500 men was using the Song Ngan River Valley some 10 km northwest of Cam Lo as an infiltration route and that the command post of the 324B Division was located on Hill 208 overlooking the southwest of the valley. The plans for the operation were for 3/4 Marines to be helilifted into the southwestern part of the valley to establish blocking positions, while 2/4 Marines would land at the mouth of the valley and move southwest along the high ground towards Hill 208 and 3/4's positions. 2/1 Marines would secure Đông Hà Combat Base while 1/3 Marines would protect Cam Lộ Combat Base and 3/12 Marines' artillery. SLF 3rd Battalion 5th Marines would launch Operation Deckhouse II, 13 km northeast of Đông Hà on 16 July and after establishing positions ashore Deckhouse would be terminated and 3/5 Marines would join Task Force Delta. The ARVN 1st Division and an airborne task force would launch Operation Lam Son 289 to the west of Route 1, with the 1st Division operating north of Đông Hà and the airborne operating south of Route 9.

== Battle ==
=== D-Day in Helicopter Valley ===
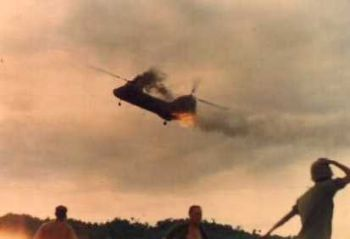
CH-46 from HMM-265 trailing smoke and flame after being hit by PAVN anti-aircraft artillery. The helicopter crashed and exploded upon impact, killing 13 marines

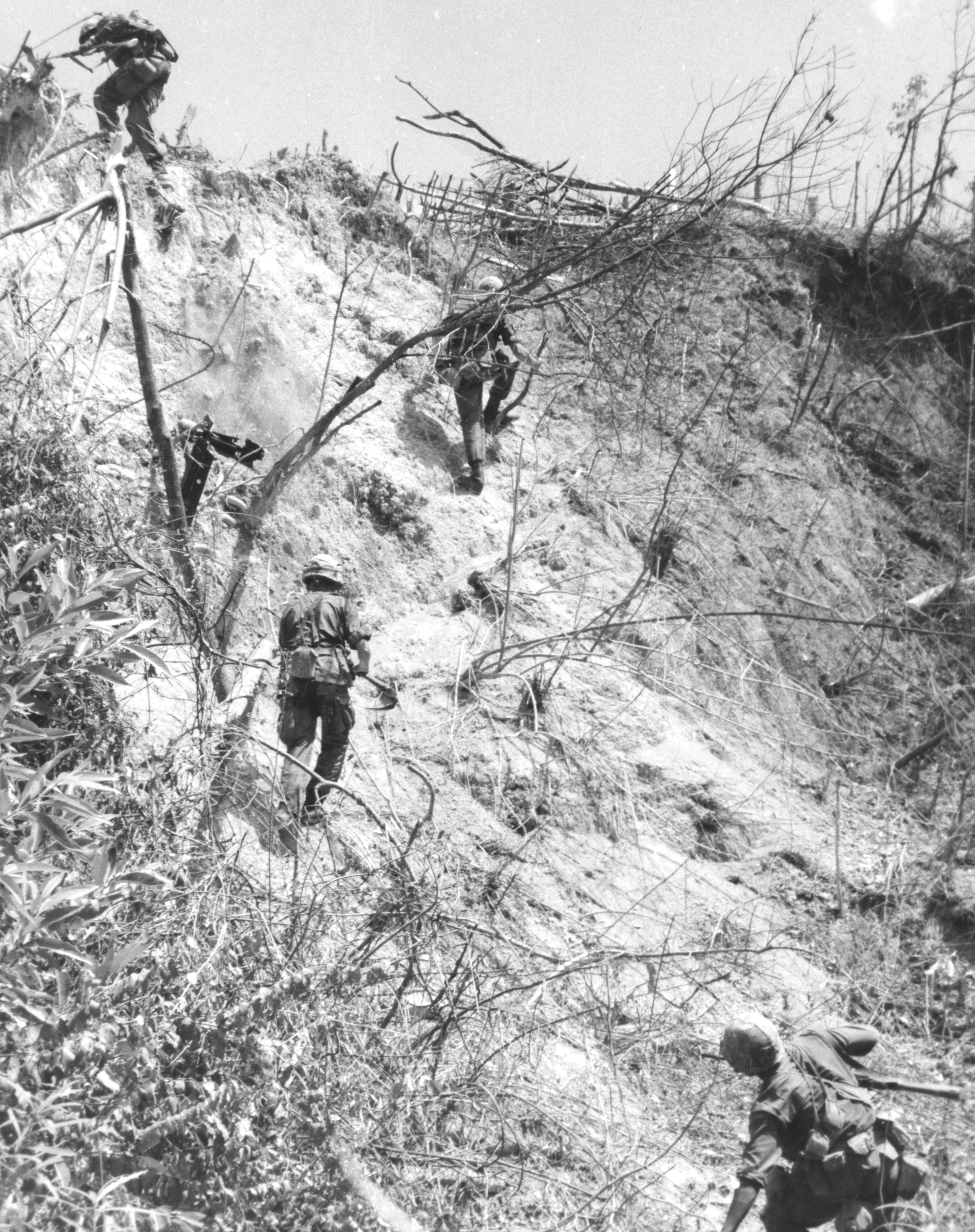
3/4 Marines assault uphill following airstrikes

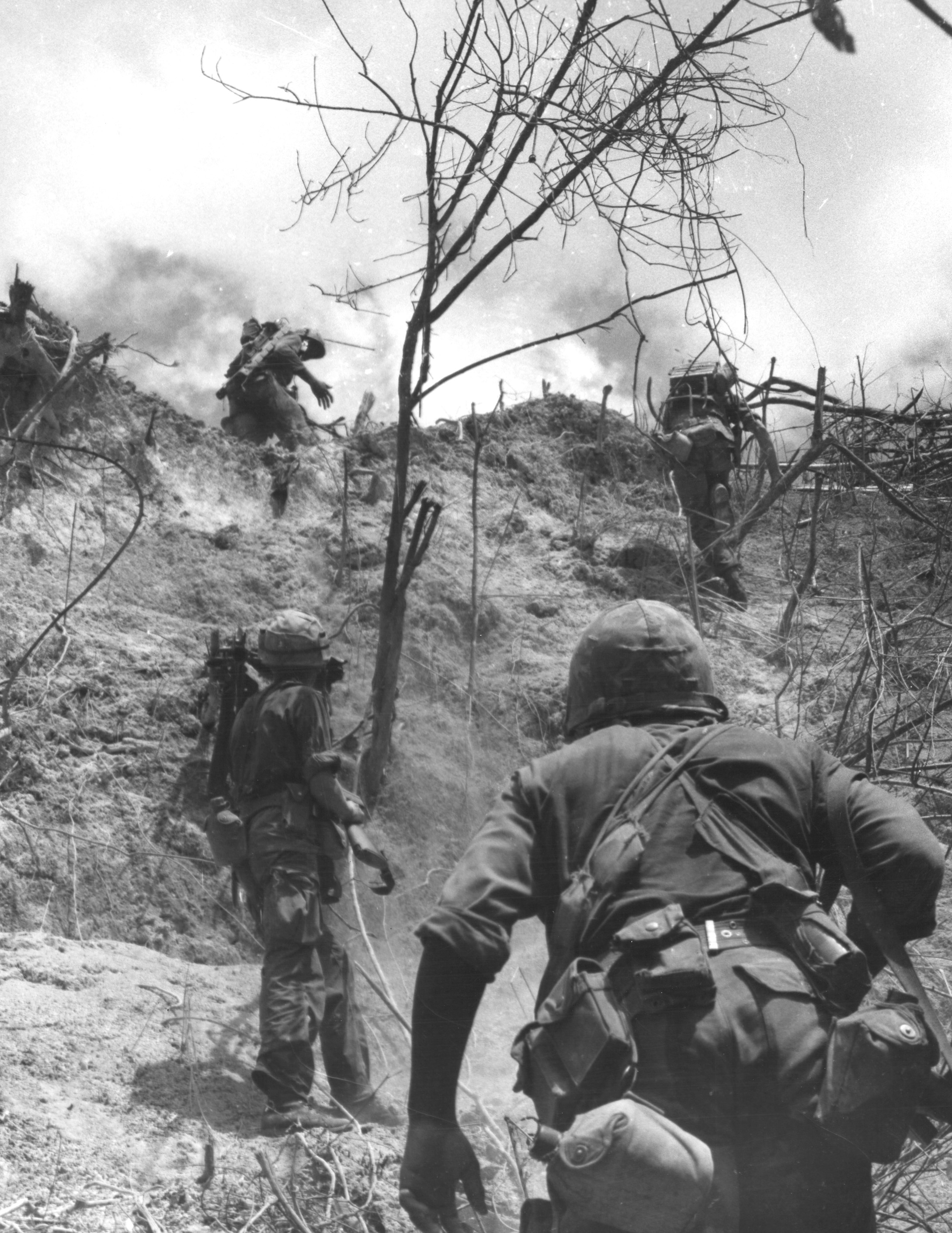
Company G, 4th Marine Regiment, attack uphill

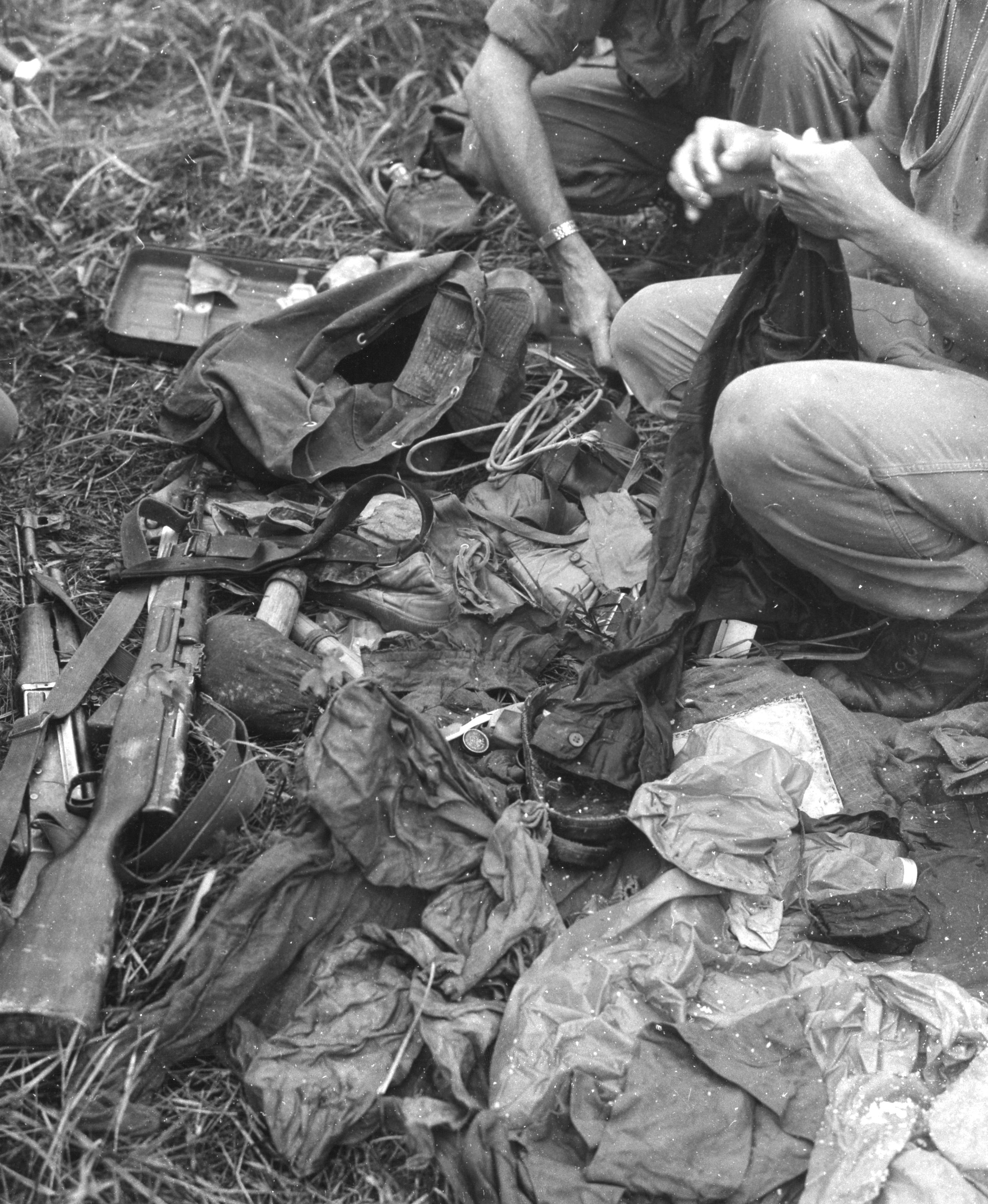
PAVN equipment captured by Company E, 2/1 Marines

On the morning of 15 July, A-4 Skyhawks from MAG-12 and F-4B Phantoms from MAG-11 began bombing and dropping napalm at the two landing zones, LZ Crow (16.861°N 106.909°E), 8 km northeast of the Rockpile and LZ Dove (16.866°N 106.953°E) at the mouth of the valley, 5 km northeast of Crow. At 07:25 3/12 artillery took over the bombardment of LZ Crow and at 07:45 20 CH-46s of HMM-164 and HMM-265 began landing 3/4 Marines on LZ Crow. While the marines met no initial resistance, LZ Crow proved to be too small for the operation. Two CH-46s from HMM-164 collided and crashed while a third CH-46 from HMM-265 hit a tree and crashed. As a result of these collisions, two marines were killed and seven injured. All three CH-46s were too badly damaged to be recovered and had to be destroyed. Later that day another CH-46 from HMM-265 carrying men from 2/1 Marines was hit by PAVN fire and crashed, killing 13 marines. Marines promptly renamed the Song Ngan to "Helicopter Valley".

Companies K and L began establishing blocking positions around LZ Crow while Company I stayed in reserve. Company K took fire and soon located a 200-bed hospital and 1,200 rounds of ammunition. Company K continued on to their objective 1.8 kilometres (1.1 mi) south of LZ Crow, but they were repulsed by PAVN fire as they tried to cross the Ngan River, with the loss of three marines killed and five wounded. Company K decided to set up night positions on a hill 180 metres (200 yd) from the river. The PAVN were now aware of the arrival of 3/4 Marines and the battalion started to come under sustained small arms, machine gun and mortar fire. By 19:30, the battalion commander Lieutenant Colonel Vale reported that his battalion was surrounded, but, 30 minutes later, under artillery and tactical air fire, the PAVN withdrew. At 20:15 a reinforced PAVN company attacked Company K's position and only withdrew after three hours of fighting. The following morning, 25 PAVN bodies were found in front of the position.

At 09:35, HMM-164 and HMM-265 CH-46s began lifting three companies of 2/4 Marines into LZ Dove. Once landed, 2/4 Marines began moving west towards 3/4 Marines, but their progress was hindered by high elephant grass and oppressive heat and humidity. 2/4 Marines were unable to move to assist 3/4 Marines and set up night positions with orders to abandon the move towards Hill 208 and proceed directly to join 3/4 Marines in the morning.

=== 16 July ===
The PAVN launched mortars into 3/4 Marines CP in the morning, and the Marines responded with airstrikes and artillery. Company K was still unable to cross the Song Ngan, but the other two companies were able to patrol unmolested to the north and northwest. 2/4 Marines set off at dawn towards 3/4's position and engaged the PAVN several times, calling in close air strikes, before linking up with 3/4 at 14:45. At 19:30 the PAVN again attacked Company K's position, making three attacks over three and a half hours. The marines suffered one dead, five seriously wounded and over 40 wounded from grenades thrown at short range. The PAVN dragged away some of their dead, but the marines counted 79 bodies the following morning.

English decided to deploy 2/1 Marines, and they were lifted into LZ Robin (16.875°N 106.942°E) 3 km northeast of LZ Crow by 30 helicopters of HMM-161, HMM-163, HMM-164 and HMM-265. At 16:00 a platoon of marines from the 1st Force Reconnaissance Company rappelled from a MAG-16 helicopter onto the summit of the Rockpile. Three hours later, they spotted a PAVN force to their east and called in artillery fire from 3/12 Marines, killing 21 PAVN, and later that night called in further fire on suspected PAVN positions south of the Rockpile.

=== 17–18 July ===
Based on the sightings from the Rockpile, 2/1 Marines were redeployed from LZ Robin to the river valley near the Rockpile by helicopters of MAG-16 on the morning of 17 July. In Helicopter Valley, there was little contact with the PAVN, but 3/4 Marines gave up trying to push south, and, anticipating further night attacks, they established a common perimeter with 2/4 Marines. English ordered the two battalions to withdraw to the northeast the following day; 2/4 was to establish blocking positions below the DMZ while 3/4 would move to the south of 2/4 and then attack south and take Hill 208. With the conclusion of Operation Deckhouse II on the morning of 18 July, 3/5 Marines would be inserted into a small valley 3 kilometres (1.9 mi) south of the Song Ngan in a suspected PAVN marshalling area. This area also provided a possible escape route for PAVN retreating from 3/4's advance on Hill 208.

At LZ Crow, on the morning of 18 July, 2/4 Marines swept north towards their new positions, which they reached without incident by mid-afternoon. At 14:00, 3/4 Marines began to move out, leaving Company K as a rearguard to provide security for the battalion CP and the engineers who were tasked with destroying captured ammunition and the three crashed CH-46s. At 14:30, the PAVN began mortaring the position and then attacked with infantry. As the Marines had filled in their fighting holes, they quickly had to dig them out again as an estimated 1,000 PAVN attacked. Company K's 1st Platoon bore the brunt of the assault and its squads were separated from each other as small groups of PAVN moved between them. Airstrikes were called in as close as 45m from the marines, and Vale called for Company L to return to the LZ and for 2/4 Marines to provide support. By 17:00, Company L had arrived at the LZ, and a company from 2/4 Marines occupied high ground overlooking the LZ. First Platoon of Company K was able to withdraw but had to leave their dead behind. By 17:00, 2/4 and 3/4 had established a common perimeter 1.7 kilometres (1.1 mi) northeast of LZ Crow. 3/4 Marines had suffered 14 dead and 49 wounded while the PAVN had suffered 138 known dead, with estimates as high as 500. Captain Robert Modrzejewski, CO of Company K, and Sergeant John McGinty, commander of the 1st Platoon, were each awarded the Medal of Honor for their actions.

3/5 Marines were lifted into their position on the afternoon of 18 July. Only Company M encountered any serious resistance and, after calling in airstrikes, they overran the PAVN positions, killing 21.

=== 19–25 July ===
On 19 July Company K was pulled out for rest and the remainder of 3/4 Marines were assigned blocking positions while 2/4 Marines reorganised for the assault on Hill 208. On the morning of 20 July following intense airstrikes, 2/4 assaulted up Hill 208, but found the heavily fortified position abandoned. 3/4 Marines was pulled out and replaced by 1/3 Marines on 21 July.

On 20 July 1/1 Marines joined 3/5 Marines in the valley below the Song Ngan and they met light but persistent resistance from small groups of PAVN as they patrolled to the west. English also ordered 2/1 Marines to deploy and establish blocking positions at the western end of the valley 4 kilometres (2.5 mi) north of the Rockpile. On the night of 21 July 2/1 Marines came under fire across their entire front and responded with small arms, mortar and artillery fire to break up the attack. The marines suffered two dead, while the number of PAVN casualties was unknown.

On 21 July Company H, 2/4 Marines returned to LZ Crow to recover the marine dead left behind on 18 July. The bodies of all eight marines were found unmolested and still with all their weapons and equipment. On 22 July the other companies of 2/4 joined Company H and began patrolling through Helicopter Valley. During these two days of the operation, which also included search and destroy missions, on 21 July elements of one platoon of Company H were fired upon and the point man was hit and killed by machine gun fire. At that point Lance corporal Richard David Kaler immediately moved forward through the heavy fire and carried the fallen marine back. On 22 July Kaler's platoon re-engaged the position and took heavy casualties and was pinned down by machine gun fire. Kaler then advanced and exposed himself to intense fire and charged the enemy positions. In this attack, and after being wounded in the thigh, Kaler silenced one enemy position before being mortally wounded. He was credited by his actions with saving many of his fellow marines and was awarded the Navy Cross.

On 24 July Company I, 3/5 Marines was setting up a radio relay station on Hill 362 approximately 7.5 kilometres (4.7 mi) north of the Rockpile. As the 2nd Platoon moved to establish forward defences on the hillside the PAVN opened fire from concealed positions. Lance corporal Richard A. Pittman of the 1st Platoon ran forward with a machine gun to cover the retreat of the 2nd Platoon and he and the survivors retreated to the crest of the hill, but the dead and wounded were left behind. One of the survivors hid among the dead as the PAVN moved forward finishing off any surviving Marines. The PAVN then dropped accurate mortar fire on the crest of Hill 362 for the next two hours until a Marine UH-1E gunship from VMO-2 silenced them. Company K moved to support Company I, but was stopped by heavy fire despite air and artillery support. Company I was also battered by heavy rains from Typhoon Ora and this and the thick jungle canopy complicated the evacuation of wounded. Eventually engineers were lowered in to cut out an LZ, but only 11 wounded were able to be evacuated. The PAVN made repeated assaults on Company I closing to within 5m at times, the marines could hear the PAVN talking and breathing nearby. By dawn the PAVN had pulled out, Company I had suffered 18 dead and 82 wounded, 21 PAVN bodies were found and two prisoners taken. Prisoner interrogation revealed that the marines had been attacked by the PAVN 6th Battalion, 812th Regiment. Pittman was later awarded the Medal of Honor for his actions on Hill 362.

On 25 July Kyle and English met at Dong Ha and decided to withdraw Task Force Delta to the south due to the difficult terrain for manoeuvre and the lack of LZs for helicopter assaults.

=== 26 July – 3 August ===
On 26 July 1/1 Marines moved south to Cam Lộ. 3/5 Marines continued to sweep to the west and operate north of the Rockpile. On 27 July 2/1 Marines moved east towards the Rockpile. In Helicopter Valley, 2/4 Marines was replaced by 2/9 Marines on 26 July and on 27 July 1/3 and 2/9 and marched south out of the valley. Despite the withdrawal of the Battalions, Marine recon patrols continued to operate in the Hastings operations area and on 28 July a recon patrol spotted 150–250 PAVN 5 km southwest of the Rockpile and called in artillery strikes killing at least 50 PAVN. Following a report of this mission Walt christened such recon patrols as "Stingray Patrols". While Hastings officially ended on 3 August, the action on 28 July was the last major action of the operation and it appeared that the 324B Division had either crossed back over the DMZ or dispersed into jungle to the west. Walt described the PAVN troops encountered during Operation Hastings as follows: "We found them well-equipped, well-trained and aggressive to the point of fanaticism. They attacked in massed formations and died by the hundreds."

== Contemporary news reporting ==
- "U.S. Accused of Zone Violation". The New York Times. 20 July 1966. p. 3.
- Tuohy, William (24 July 1966). "N. Viet Division Fails in Aim to Seize 2 Cities". Los Angeles Times. pp. E1. Archived from the original on 1 October 2007.
- "A Prisoner's Tip Sparks A Battle". The New York Times. 25 July 1966. p. 2.
- "Division from the North". Time. 29 July 1966. Archived from the original on 30 September 2007.
- "B-52s Attack 3 Red Positions In S. Vietnam". The Washington Post and Times-Herald. 29 July 1966. pp. A1. Archived from the original on 1 October 2007.
- "Hanoi's Humanitarianism". Time. 5 August 1966. Archived from the original on 22 February 2008.
- Norris, John G. (7 August 1966). "Rout of North Viet Division Indicates Big Change in War". The Washington Post and Times-Herald. pp. A18. Archived from the original on 1 October 2007.
- "Quiet No More". Time. 12 August 1966. Archived from the original on 30 September 2007.
