= Robert J. Modrzejewski =

American military officer

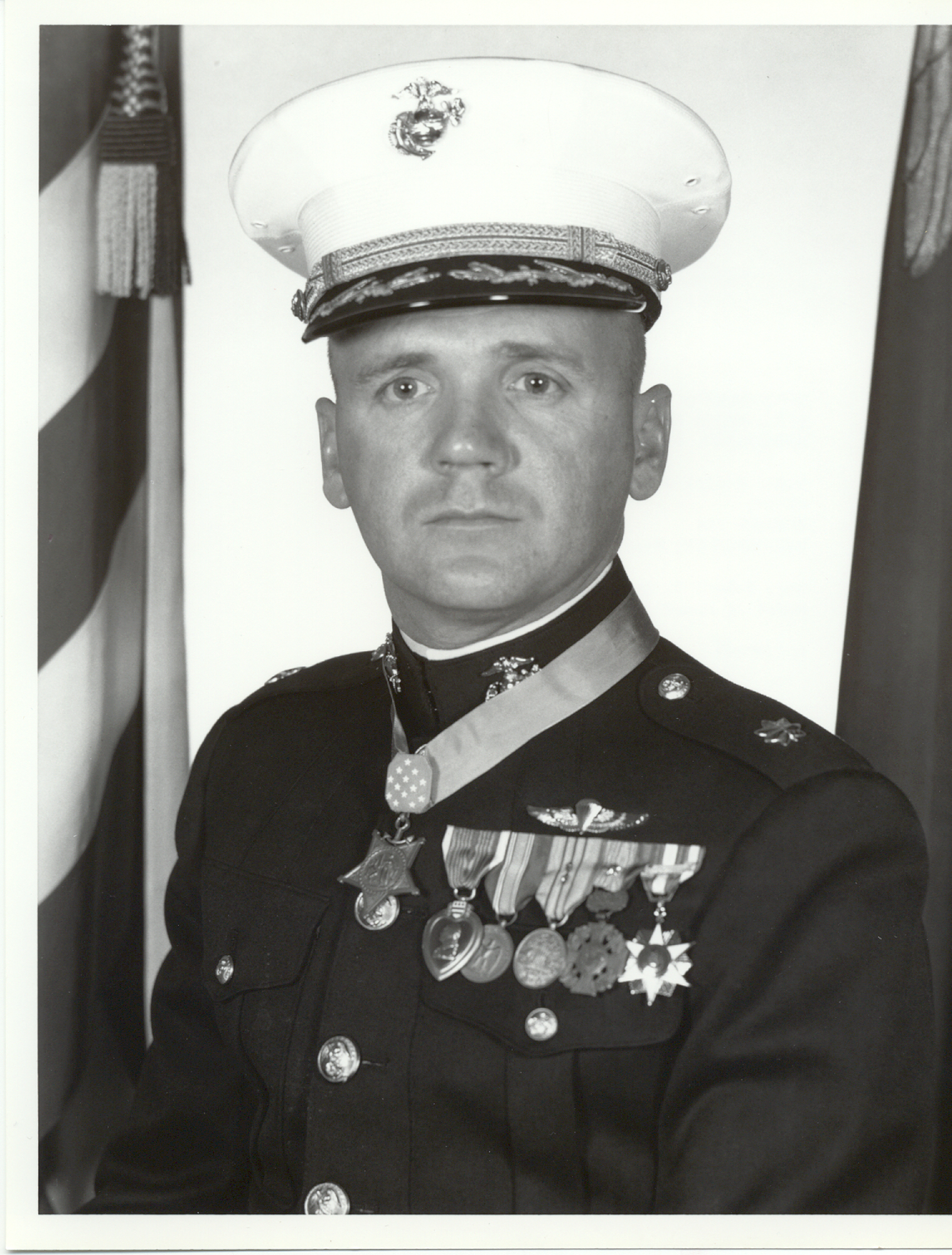
- Robert J. Modrzejewski
- Born: July 3, 1934 (age 92); Milwaukee, Wisconsin, U.S.
- Military career
- Allegiance: United States
- Branch: United States Marine Corps
- Service years: 1955–1986
- Rank: Colonel
- Unit: 3rd Battalion 4th Marines
- Conflicts: Vietnam War
- Awards: Medal of Honor; Legion of Merit; Purple Heart

Robert Joseph Modrzejewski (born July 3, 1934) is a retired United States Marine Corps officer who is a recipient of the United States' highest military decoration, the Medal of Honor, for conspicuous gallantry in the Vietnam War.

== Early life ==
Robert Modrzejewski was born on July 3, 1934, in Milwaukee, Wisconsin. He graduated from Milwaukee's Casimir Pulaski High School in 1953. He attended Wisconsin State Teachers College prior to entering the University of Wisconsin–Milwaukee, where he earned a Bachelor of Science degree in Education in 1957.

== Military career ==
Modrzejewski joined the Marine Corps Reserve in 1955 while at the University of Wisconsin-Milwaukee, and was a member of the Platoon Leaders Class; upon graduation in June 1957, he was commissioned a second lieutenant.

Modrzejewski completed the 4-57 Basic Course, The Basic School, Marine Corps Schools, Quantico, Virginia, in March 1958, then served as an instructor at The Basic School until the following May.

From June 1958 until September 1959, Modrzejewski was attached to the 3rd Battalion, 3rd Marines, 3rd Marine Division, and served as a platoon leader of H&S Company, as well as platoon leader and S-2 Officer of Company I and Company M, respectively. He was promoted to first lieutenant in December 1958.

Transferred to Camp Lejeune, North Carolina, Modrzejewski served, successively, as Equipment Officer with the Landing Support Company, 2nd Service Battalion, 2nd Marine Division until May 1960; Pathfinder Team Leader of the 2nd Force Reconnaissance Company, until December 1960; Pathfinder Team Leader with Sub Unit One, HMR(L)-262, MAG-26 at Marine Corps Air Facility, New River, North Carolina, until May 1961, and again as Pathfinder Team Leader and Parachute Pathfinder Team Leader with the 2d Force Reconnaissance Company, until May 1962. While serving in the latter capacity, he served aboard the USS San Marcos with Sub Unit #2. He was promoted to captain in May 1962.

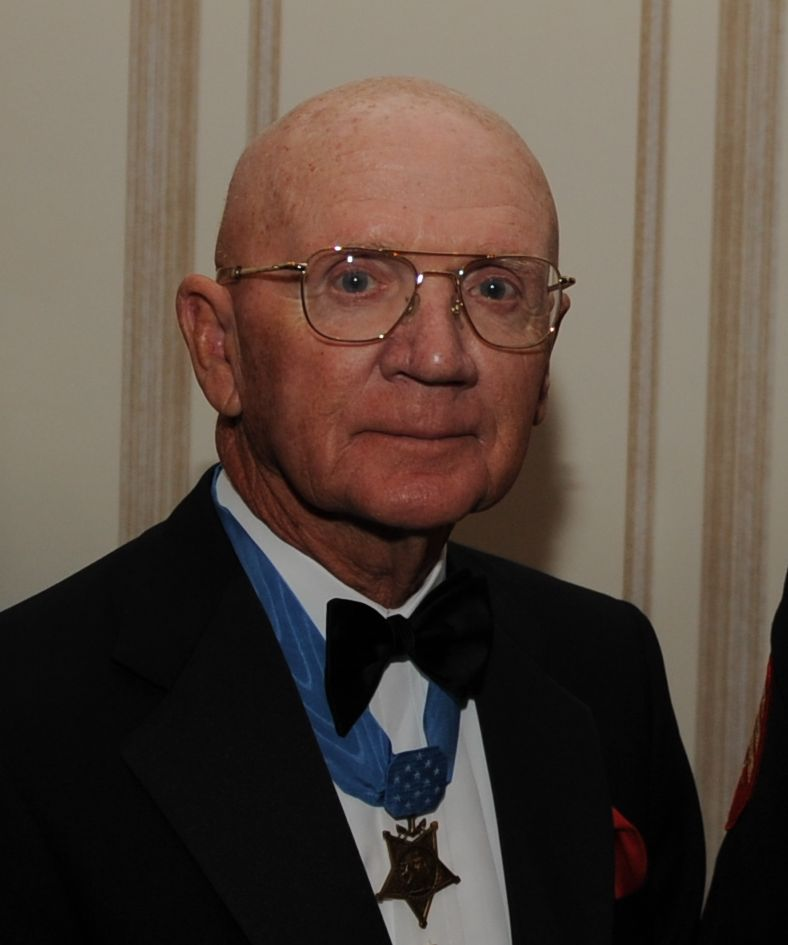
Modrzejewski in 2011

Modrzejewski saw a three-year tour of duty as Assistant Officer in Charge, Marine Corps Recruiting Station, Cincinnati, Ohio. In May 1965, he returned to the Marine Corps Schools in Quantico, Virginia, and served as executive officer, Company E, Officers Candidates Schools, until August 1965, then attended the Amphibious Warfare School, completing the course in February 1966.

Ordered to the West Coast, then to the Republic of Vietnam, Modrzejewski assumed duty as commanding officer of Company K, 3rd Battalion, 4th Marines, 3rd Marine Division. It was during this period, during Operation Hastings, that he distinguished himself above and beyond the call of duty — for which he was awarded the Medal of Honor.

In a White House ceremony on March 12, 1968, President Lyndon B. Johnson presented the Medal of Honor to two Marines for their actions in Vietnam — Major Modrzejeski and Second Lieutenant John J. McGinty, III.

Modrzejewski later served as Battalion S-3 and Company Commander until December 1966, then became Command Operations Center Watch Officer with Headquarters Company, 3rd Marine Division, Fleet Marine Force, until May 1967. He was promoted to major in January 1967.

Upon his return to the United States in June 1967, Modrzejewski was assigned to the United States Naval Academy in Annapolis, Maryland, as Commanding Officer of the Marine Barracks. In January 1970, he entered the Armed Forces Staff College, Norfolk, Virginia, and completed the course the following June. He then reported to Marine Corps Air Station, Kaneohe, Hawaii, for duty with Headquarters and Service Company, First Marine Brigade.

In 1976, Modrzejewki earned his Master's degree in Education from Pepperdine University in Los Angeles, California.

Colonel Modrzejewski retired from the Marine Corps in August 1986.

== Decorations ==
A complete list of his medals and decorations includes:

Medal of Honor	Legion of Merit	Purple Heart
Meritorious Service Medal with gold 5/16 inch star	Presidential Unit Citation	National Defense Service Medal
Vietnam Service Medal with two bronze stars	Vietnam Cross of Gallantry with Gold Star	Vietnam Campaign Medal

== Medal of Honor citation ==
The President of the United States in the name of The Congress takes pleasure in presenting the MEDAL OF HONOR to

MAJOR ROBERT J. MODRZEJEWSKI
UNITED STATES MARINE CORPS

for service as set forth in the following CITATION:

For conspicuous gallantry and intrepidity at the risk of his life above and beyond the call of duty while serving as Commanding Officer, Company K, Third Battalion, Fourth Marines, Third Marines, Third Marine Division, in the Republic of Vietnam from 15 to July 18, 1966. On July 15, during Operation HASTINGS, Company K was landed in an enemy infested jungle area to establish a blocking position at a major enemy trail network. Shortly after landing, the company encountered a reinforced enemy platoon in a well organized, defensive position. Major (then Captain) Modrzejewski led his men in the successful seizure of the enemy redoubt, which contained large quantities of ammunition and supplies. That evening a numerically superior enemy force counterattacked in an effort to retake the vital supply area, thus setting the pattern of activity for the next two and one-half days. In the first series of attacks, the enemy assaulted repeatedly in overwhelming numbers but each time was repulsed by the gallant Marines. The second night the enemy struck in battalion strength, and Major Modrzejewski was wounded in this intensive action which was fought at close quarters. Although exposed to enemy fire, and despite his painful wounds, he crawled 200 meters to provide critically needed ammunition to an exposed element of his command and was constantly present wherever the fighting was heaviest. Despite numerous casualties, a dwindling supply of ammunition and the knowledge that they were surrounded, he skillfully directed artillery fire to within a few meters of his position and courageously inspired the efforts of his company in repelling the aggressive enemy attack. On July 18, Company K was attacked by a regimental size enemy force. Although his unit was outnumbered and weakened by the previous fighting, Major Modrzejewski reorganized his men and calmly moved among them to encourage and direct their efforts to heroic limits as they fought to overcome the vicious enemy onslaught. Again he called in air and artillery strikes at close range with devastating effect on the enemy, which together with the bold and determined fighting of the men of Company K, repulsed the fanatical attack of the larger North Vietnamese force. His unparalleled personal heroism and indomitable leadership inspired his men to a significant victory over the enemy force and reflected great credit upon himself, the Marine Corps and the United States Naval Service.

/S/ LYNDON B. JOHNSON

== Honors ==
In 2004, the UWM Alumni Association honored Modrzejewski with a Distinguished Alumnus Award.

In 2005, the State of Oklahoma designated March 26, 2005, as "Colonel Robert J. Modrzejewski Day" and issued a resolution praising the courage of the Medal of Honor recipient.

== See also ==
- List of Medal of Honor recipients for the Vietnam War
