= 3rd Battalion, 4th Marines =

- Active: May 1, 1941 – May 6, 1942; February 1, 1944 – October 1, 1947; November 28, 1952 – May 30, 2014; September 17, 2015 – present
- Country: United States of America
- Branch: United States Marine Corps
- Type: U.S. Marine Corps Infantry Battalion
- Part of: 7th Marine Regiment; 1st Marine Division
- Garrison/HQ: Marine Corps Air Ground Combat Center Twentynine Palms
- Nickname: DARKSIDE
- Mascot: The water buffalo of Southeast Asia
- Engagements: World War II; Battle of Corregidor; Battle of Bougainville; Battle of Guam; Battle of Okinawa; Vietnam War; Operation Hastings; Operation Prairie; Operation Hickory; Operation Kingfisher; Operation Kentucky; War on terror; Operation Iraqi Freedom; Operation Enduring Freedom; Operation Inherent Resolve
- Website: https://www.1stmardiv.marines.mil/Units/7TH-MARINE-REGT/3d-Battalion-4th-Marines/

Commanders
- Current commander: Lt. Col. Andrew D. Wright
- Notable commanders: Alexander Vandegrift; James Laster; B.P. McCoy; Wayne Rollings; Lawrence H. Livingston

3rd Battalion, 4th Marines (3/4) or (V34) is an infantry battalion of the United States Marine Corps. Nicknamed "Thundering Third" and "Darkside," it is based at the Marine Corps Air Ground Combat Center, Twentynine Palms, California, and consist of approximately 1,000 Marines. The unit currently falls under the command of the 7th Marine Regiment, 1st Marine Division, but — along with its two sister battalions — is hosted by the 3rd Marine Division, at Camp Schwab in Okinawa, Japan, when training in jungle warfare. The 3rd falls under the 4th Marine Regiment at such times.

== Subordinate units ==
- Headquarters and Service Company
- Fires and Reconnaissance Company
- Company I (Iron Company)
- Company K (Keystone Company)
- Company L (Lucky Lima Company)

== History ==
=== Early years ===
The battalion was first activated in 1925 at Naval Base San Diego, California. Since its initial inception in 1925, this unit has had several periods of activation.

=== World War II ===
On May 1, 1941, at Cavite, Philippine Islands became the First Separate Marine Battalion, Navy Yard, Cavite. Relocated during December 1941 to Corregidor, Philippine Islands. Redesignated January 1, 1942, to the Third Battalion, Fourth Marines, Corregidor, Philippine Island. The 4th Marine Regiment participated in the Battle of Corregidor from January to May 1942. The unit was ordered to surrender by Lieutenant General Jonathan Wainwright on May 6, 1942, an order with which Colonel Samuel L. Howard, the commanding officer of the 4th Marines, agreed. Colonel Curtis, the regimental executive officer, ordered Captain Robert B. Moore to take the regimental colors outside and burn them rather than allow them to fall into enemy hands. Once the order was carried out, Colonel Howard wept and said, "My God, and I had to be the first Marine officer ever to surrender a regiment." After this 4th Marines temporarily ceased to exist.

On February 1, 1944, four Marine Raider battalions were amalgamated into a re-established 4th Marine Regiment, bearing the name and honors of the original 4th Regiment lost in the Philippines in 1942. The 1st, 4th, and 3rd Raider Battalions became respectively the 1st, 2nd, and 3rd Battalions, 4th Marines. The 2nd Raider Battalion became the regimental weapons company. Forming part of the 1st Provisional Marine Brigade and later 6th Marine Division, the 4th Marines fought in the battles of Guam and Okinawa.

=== Vietnam War ===
On April 14, 1965, 3rd battalion 4th Marines was deployed to an area near Chu Lai, South Vietnam. Two companies were sent north to Phu Bai to secure a small airfield just 8 miles south of Huế City. First contact was made on April 22 southwest of Da Nang with a Vietcong (VC) unit. The Marines at Phu Bai made their first contact on April 24. Both sides lost two men. These patrols continued until the whole battalion re-deployed back to Okinawa on December 24, 1965. In March 1966, the battalion returned to the Phu Bai, Huế City areas. They participated in company and platoon size patrols and ambushes against the VC in the Thừa Thiên–Huế Province till the end of June 1966. At that time the entire battalion moved north and just south of the DMZ, in the Song Ngan River Valley also known as "Helicopter Valley", because of all the helicopters that were shot down with Marines on board. There they participated in Operation Hastings which was a multi-battalion operation that ran from July 15 to August 3, 1966. This was the first major Marine campaign against the People's Army of Vietnam (PAVN). A total of 8,000 Marines participated in this large operation. It stop the PAVN from further advancing into South Vietnam. The PAVN 324B Division losses were put at 824 killed and 17 POWs. Total Marine losses were put at 126 killed and 448 wounded. Capt. Robert J. Modrzejewski and SSgt. John J. McGinty were both awarded the Medal of Honor for their action and leadership during this time. This operation was also the most costly of the war to this point.

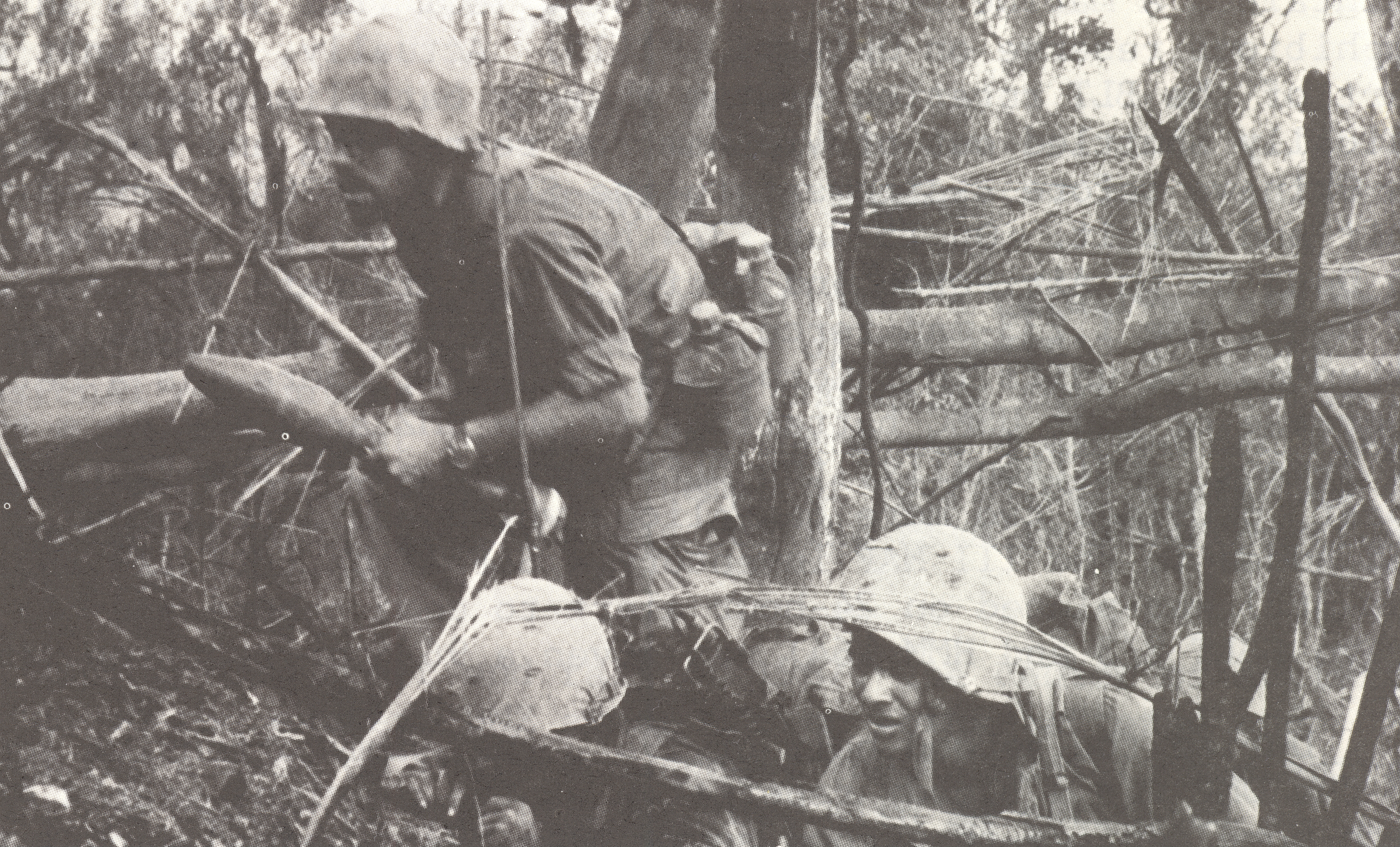
A U.S. marine from 3d Battalion, 4th Marines, moves forward during Operation Prairie.

In August 3/4 was back in Phu Bai again running patrols and ambushes in search and destroy missions. Early September the battalion moved its headquarters 55 miles (89 km) north to Đông Hà. On September 22, 1966, the battalion was again in action against the 324B Division in Operation Prairie which ran from August 3 to October 27, 1966. Fighting for Hill 400 and Hill 484 and also called Mutter's Ridge in the Razor Back Mountains, a heavily fortified Nui Cay Tri ridge. It was very costly for both sides, losses were put at nearly 1,300 PAVN killed and total Marine losses were put at 200 killed and over a 1,000 wounded. Captain James J. Carroll was later posthumously awarded a Navy Cross for valor on Hill 484.

Photojournalist Larry Burrows took a large collection of Time-Life photos during the operation. The most recognizable is a Pulitzer Prize-winning photo, taken on Hill 400, showing wounded Gunnery Sergeant Jeremiah Purdie being guided by a Hospital Corpsman Darrell Hinde as he reaches out to Lance Corporal Paul Holland Mitchell who was also seriously wounded and waiting to be treated. The photo called "Reaching Out" is shown in many special Time-Life issues.

At the end of 1966 the 4th Marine Regiment was pulled out of the DMZ and sent south to participate in Operation Chinook around Huế. When that operation ended the battalion went into a rebuilding stage.

On January 31, 1967 Operation Prairie II started. On February 27 L/3/4 and a tank platoon was involved in a battle near Hill 48 to save a recon team that ran into a PAVN Regiment. On the 28th other Marine companies including M/3/4 were brought in for ground operation. When the operation ended total casualties for both sides were put at 93 marines killed, 483 wounded and the PAVN losses were put at 694 killed. Prairie II ended on March 18, but Operation Prairie III started the next day. The battalion was pulled back to regroup and rebuild. For the next couple of months the battalion worked Route 9 guarding lines near Cam Lo, The Rockpile and Camp Carroll, which was the largest concentration of artillery pieces in northern I Corps. July and parts of August it was time for the battalion to spend time in the "Barrel", Con Thien.

On September 4 the battalion was ambushed just south of Con Thien with heavy casualties. 3/4 was pulled back for rebuilding its manpower. Some of the other major Operations in 1967 were Operation Hickory (May 18 to May 28), Operation Kingfisher (July 16 to Oct 31) and Operation Kentucky near Con Thien in the western area of Leatherneck Square in the latter part of 1967 and in January 1968. Other operations the battalion participated in 1968 and 1969 were Operation Lancaster II (Jan 21 to Nov 25, 1968), and Operation Robin (2–19 June) along Route 9 southeast of Khe Sanh.

After November 6, 3/4 was the last infantry battalion of the 3rd Marine Division left in South Vietnam. On November 24, 1969, the battalion sailed from Vietnam to Okinawa.

=== 1980s & 1990s ===
Reassigned January 1983 to 6th Marines, 2nd Marine Division, Camp Lejeune, NC. January 1984 deployed to Camp Schwab, Okinawa, Japan returning to Camp Lejeune in the summer of 1984. Became the Marine Corps first "MARSOC" qualified Special Operations Capable Battalion as part of the 26th Marine Amphibious Unit in 1985 and then deployed November 1985 to the Mediterranean aboard the USS Guadalcanal. April 15, 1986 participated in Operation El Dorado Canyon, Libya. The first Marine unit in combat in Panama during Operation Just Cause was India Company, 3/4. They landed in Panama on April 6, 1988, and by April 10 were engaged in combat with clandestine units from Cuba. Some might have been from the 7th Company of the Panamanian Defense Forces, known as the "Macho de Monte" or "mountain machos", a special ops / guerrilla warfare unit named after a sort of aggressive wild boar.

1996–1997 saw the battalion participate in Operation Hunter Warrior (Sea Dragon). The objective of the operation was to test experimental gear, weapons and other equipment essential to a Marine Rifle Squad. In 1998 the battalion was transferred from Camp Pendleton, California, to Marine Corps Air Ground Combat Center in 29 Palms, California. There they worked back to full battalion strength and prepared for deployment to Camp Schwab, Okinawa in 1999–2000.

During this time the battalion also completed the summer and winter warfare training packages at Marine Corps Cold Weather Training Bridgeport, California.

=== Global war on terrorism – Iraq ===
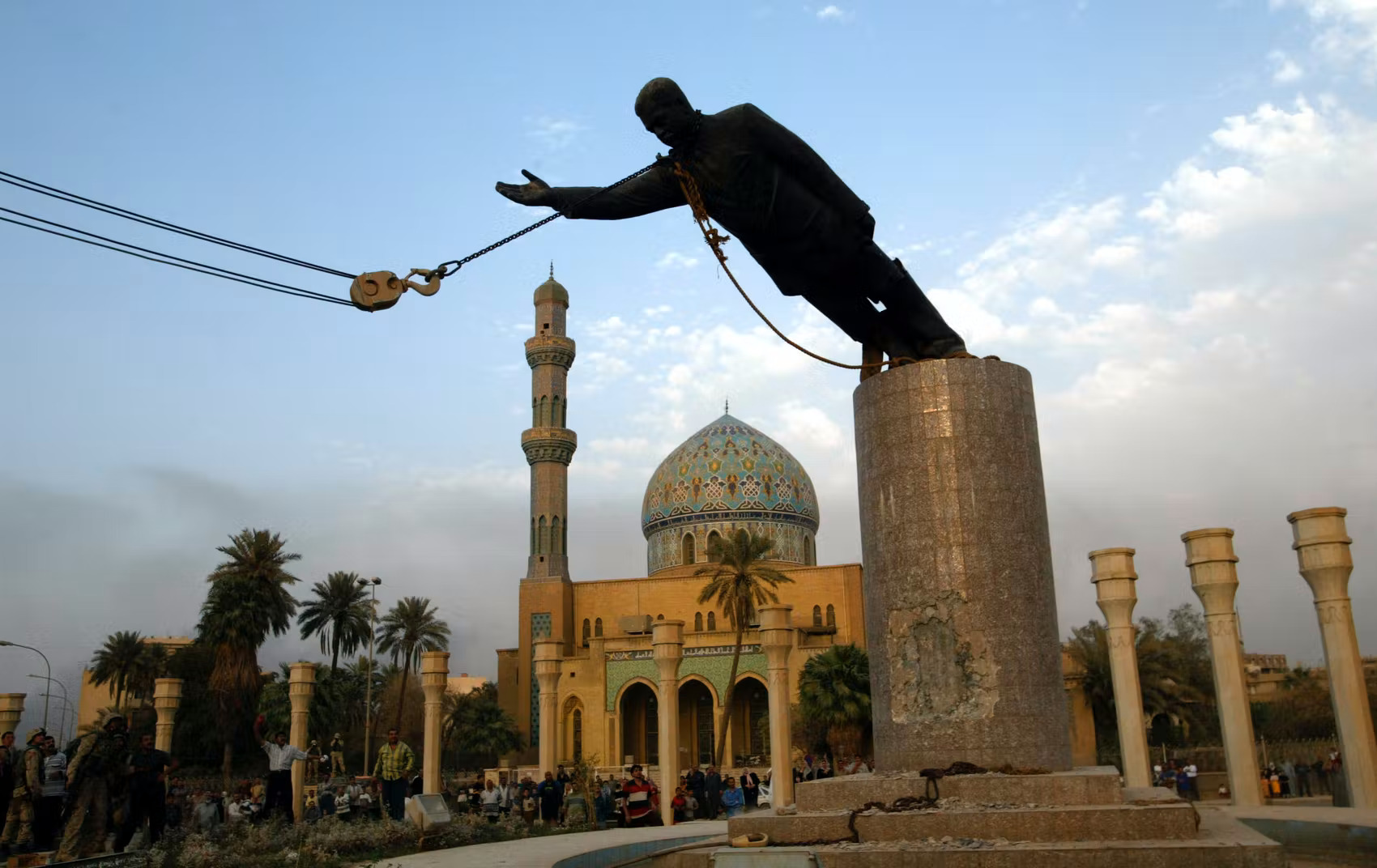
The April 2003 toppling of Saddam Hussein’s statue in Firdos Square in Baghdad shortly after the Iraq War invasion.

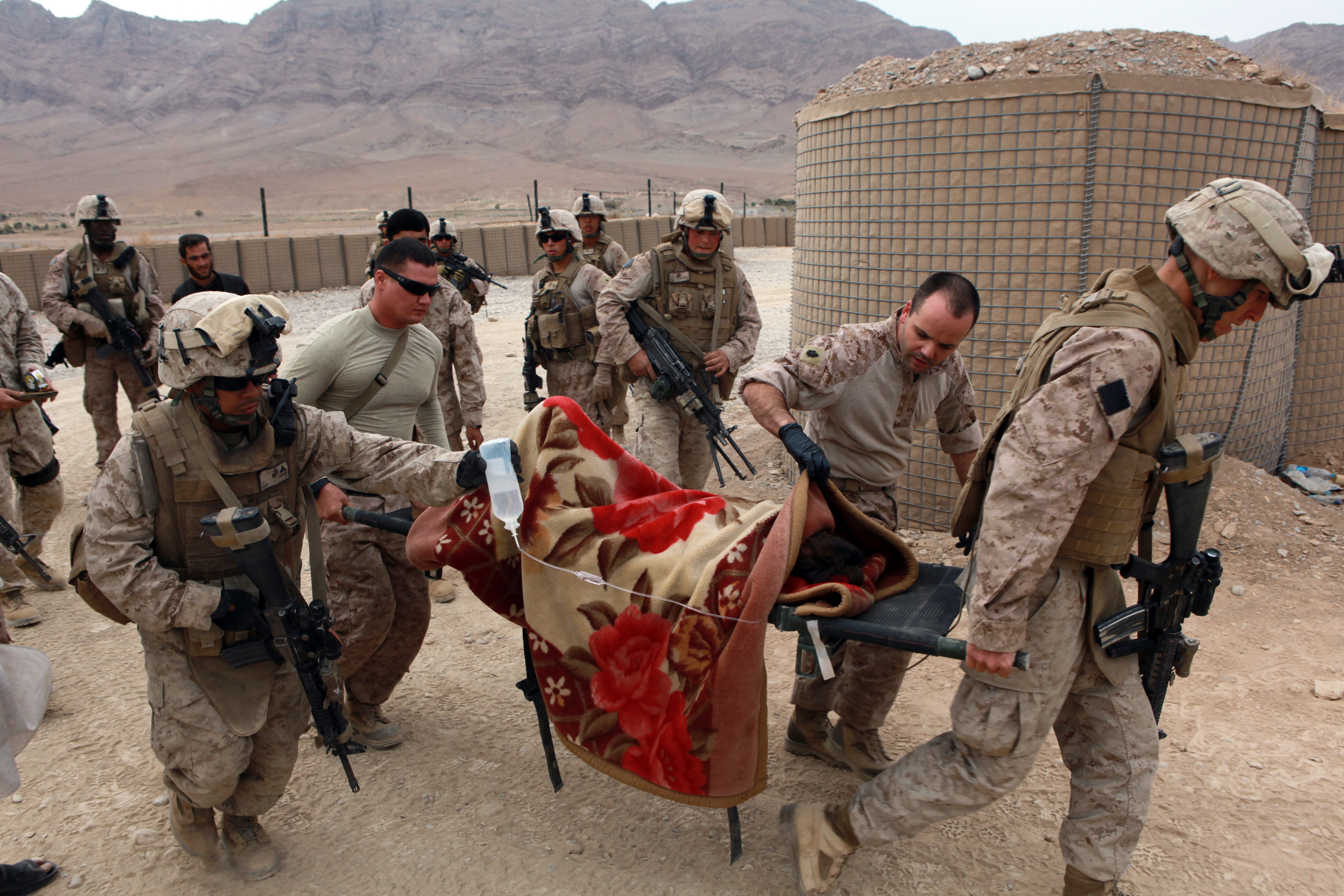
Marines and Sailors tend to the medical needs of an injured boy in Helmand Province, Afghanistan.

3/4 deployed to Kuwait in January 2003 and went on to participate in the 2003 invasion of Iraq. The group was led by Lt. Col. Brian P. McCoy. They were the first U.S. Marine unit to enter Baghdad. This battalion was shown in the famous scene of the statue of Saddam in Firdos Square being pulled down. The battalion redeployed to Iraq in March 2004 and subsequently took part in Operation Vigilant Resolve while attached to the 1st Marine Regiment. They subsequently deployed to Fallujah, Iraq in January 2005 and provided oversight for Iraq's first national election in decades.

3/4 deployed again in September 2006 to the Al Qaim region in the Euphrates River Valley of Iraq, in Western Al Anbar Province, conducting counter insurgency combat operations and support and security operations. 3/4 saw heavy fighting throughout the deployment. The Marines were spread out in individual platoon-sized combat outposts along the river side, where fighting was especially intense, particularly in the first half of their extended 9-month deployment. Around Spring time in the second half of the Marines' deployment, the fighting turned to more small scale ambushes and IED attacks conducted by the enemy, who had become increasingly affected by losses in manpower and equipment in the large scale fighting that took place throughout the Fall and Winter months of 2006 and 2007.

The battalion suffered 12 KIA, and over 100 WIA during the nearly 9-month deployment, which was due to being extended for the Troop Surge in early 2007. After returning home to Twentynine Palms in late May, 2007, the battalion again deployed in early 2008 to Al Anbar with dual missions of carrying out combat operations, training Iraqi security forces, and supervising the Iraqi peacekeeping effort. Their area of operations reached from Haditha to Hit, becoming the largest area any military unit had controlled in support of Operation Iraqi Freedom.

The battalion also became the first U.S. military unit to reach 5 straight Iraq deployments and returned from their deployment in early September 2008. They are also one of only two Marine battalions with eight straight combat deployments, the other being 3/7.

=== Global war on terrorism – Afghanistan ===
The battalion deployed in support of Operation Enduring Freedom in Afghanistan for the first time from October 2009 to May 2010. Before deploying, the battalion completed Cold Weather Warfare Training in Bridgeport, California. They had also completed Helicopter assault training that was facilitated by the Weapons and Tactic Instructor Course(WTI). Hosted by the Marine Aviation Weapons and Tactics Squadron One(MAWTS-1) in Yuma, Arizona. The battalion participated in Operation Cobra's Anger, the first major offensive of the war after President Obama announced a troop surge to the country. The battalion was deployed in large swath of area between the Helmand and Farah Provinces which included places such as Now Zad, Delaram, Golestan and Bakwa.

In April 2011 to October 2011, Lima, Kilo and Weapons companies, along with other supporting units, deployed to the dangerous Upper Gereshk Valley, and Sangin, in Helmand Province, Afghanistan. The Marines were ordered to keep Taliban forces pinned down in the 'green zone' around the Helmand River so that work on nearby Route 611 could continue uninterrupted. There was heavy fighting throughout the deployment, as well as a series of catastrophic IED attacks. Over the next six months, five Marines were killed in action (Staff Sergeant Leon H. Lucas, Corporal Paul W. Zanowick, and Lance Corporals Mark R. Goyet, Jason D. Hill, and Christopher L. Camero) and many more wounded in the face of repeated enemy attacks on patrols. In October, with work completed on Route 611 and their mission accomplished, the battalion withdrew from the valley and returned to the United States. India company had deployed to Jordan to train alongside Jordanian forces. The company had also served as a reserve element for the battalion, sending dozens of Marines to Afghanistan as combat replacements due to the high number of casualties the companies had suffered throughout the deployment.

In March 2013 the battalion deployed to Helmand province, operating primarily from Company sized FOBs in Sangin, Now Zad, and Musa Qaleh, along with platoon sized elements pushed to forward OPs. The battalion returned home in October 2013, completing their 8th OEF/OIF combat deployment, the most of any USMC battalion since 2001.

=== Marine Unit Deployment Program ===
The battalion deployed in 2017 from April to October to Darwin Australia under the Marine Corp's Unit Deployment Program as Marine Rotational Force - Darwin (MRF-D). Multinational training programs were executed with participants from Australia, Japan, France and elements from the United States Army and the United States Special Operations Command. During the deployment 3rd Battalion 4th Marines established itself as a Marine Air Ground Task Force (MAGTF). Supporting elements came from tilt wing and rotary wing helicopter squadrons, logistics units, and engineering elements. The mission of the MAGTF was to build cohesion with the Australian Defence Force and the United States Marine Corps. The most notable exercise was Talisman Sabre.

=== Special Purpose MAGTF ===
In October 2018 V34 deployed to CENTCOM AOR to relieve V37 across five countries. Portions of which were conducted under enemy pressure. Marines spent time in Syria prepping CBRN gear, coordinating assault support for the battalion's forward companies and certifying and inspecting training ranges. They supported exercise CUNNING SEAHOURSE in Jordan. Marines conducted SME exchanges in Kuwait with the Kuwaiti military. The company that supported Task Force Spartan conduced a convoy to Fallujah, Iraq to support a key leader engagement for the task force commander. V34 redeployed to MCAGCC in March 2019 after conducting RIP/TOA with 1/7.

=== Special Purpose MAGTF Customs and Border Patrol ===
1 January 2020 V34 entered the execution phase and deployed to the Southern California border in order to conduct observation and reporting operations in support of the Southwest Border Mission. V34's AOR consisted of western border of Imperial Beach, CA and stretched east along the southern border to the eastern border of El Centro, CA. In March, V34 conducted a RIPTOA with V35 and transferred the SWBM AOR and redeployed to MCAGCC.

=== UDP-West Okinawa ===
The battalion deployed to Camp Schwab Okinawa Japan in October 2022. Lima Company began preparation for their departur to Republic of Korea where they would conduct an exchange with the ROK Marine Corps. Kilo Company went to mainland Japan in January in 2023 along with Weapons Company to participate in Fuji Viper 23.2. On Camp Schwab India Company served as the Alert Contingency MAGTF(ACM) for III MEF. The battalion also participated in Stand-In Force Exercise and Jungle Warfare Exercise 23 on the island of Okinawa.

=== Infantry Battalion Experiment & Force Design 2030 ===
As a part of Force Design 2030 V34 was tasked with experimenting with the design ofn the infantry battalion. Changes included dispersing Weapons Company into the line companies, implementing a maturity quotient where GySgt's were platoon sergeants, SSgt's as squad leaders and MSgt's as Ops Chiefs. Other changes included adding the first ever Cyber Officer at the infantry battalion, adding an Influence Officer and Influence Chief, adding Signals Intelligence/ Electromagnetic warfare, and increasing the amount of Small UAS systems organic to the battalion. After an intensive 18 month workup between 29 Palms, Camp Pendleton and the Army's National Training Center the battalion deployed to Okinawa Japan once again.

== 3/4 Medal of Honor recipients ==
- Robert J. Modrzejewski
- John J. McGinty III
- Donald E. Ballard

== Notable personnel ==
- Lou Diamond
- Jack Coughlin
- Joshua Sweeney
- David Zien
- David Furness
- Carlos A. Ruiz
- Micheal Barrett

== See also ==
- Operation Vigilant Resolve
- Organization of the United States Marine Corps
- List of United States Marine Corps battalions
