= Richard A. Pittman =

United States Marine Corps Medal of Honor recipient (1945–2016)

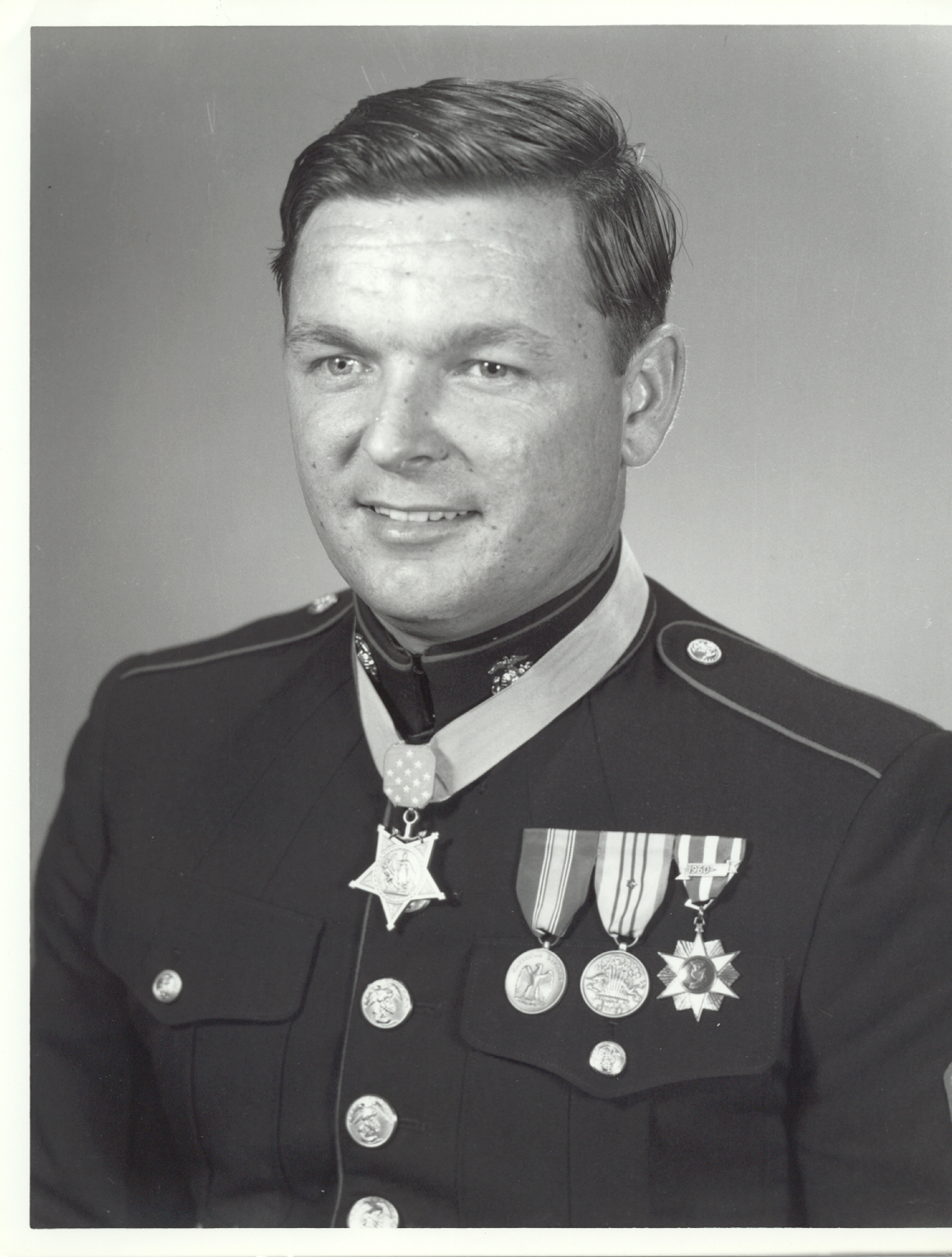
- Richard A. Pittman, Medal of Honor recipient
- Born: Richard Allan Pittman; May 26, 1945; San Joaquin, California
- Died: October 13, 2016 (aged 71); Stockton, California
- Burial place: Cherokee Memorial Park, Lodi, California
- Military career
- Allegiance: United States
- Branch: United States Marine Corps
- Service years: 1965–1968, 1970–1988
- Rank: Master Sergeant
- Unit: 3rd Battalion, 5th Marines
- Conflicts: Vietnam War
- Awards: Medal of Honor

Master Sergeant Richard Allan Pittman (May 26, 1945 – October 13, 2016) was a United States Marine who received the Medal of Honor for his heroic actions on July 24, 1966, during the Vietnam War.

== Early life and education ==
Richard Allan Pittman was born on May 26, 1945, in San Joaquin County, near Stockton, California. He attended Hazelton Elementary School, Fremont Junior High School, and graduated from Franklin High School, Stockton, California, in June 1964.

== Career ==
After he was turned down by the Army and Navy due to being legally blind in one eye, Pittman enlisted in the U.S. Marine Corps Reserve at Stockton on September 27, 1965. He was discharged on October 31, 1965, to enlist in the regular Marine Corps on November 1, 1965.

After recruit training at Marine Corps Recruit Depot San Diego, California in December 1965, he went on to individual combat training with the 1st Battalion, 2nd Infantry Training Regiment, Camp Pendleton, California, graduating in February 1966. Upon graduation, he was promoted to private first class.

Transferred to the Far East in the Republic of Vietnam, he joined Company I, Battalion Landing Team 3rd Battalion, 5th Marines, 1st Marine Division and served as a rifleman with this unit until May 1966. He then became a rifleman and squad leader with Company I, 3rd Battalion, 5th Marines, 1st Marine Division, serving in this capacity until February 1967. He was promoted to Lance Corporal on July 1, 1966, and received a meritorious promotion to Corporal on November 12, 1966.

Corporal Pittman next saw duty as section leader and motor vehicle operator with Transport Company, 7th Motor Transport Battalion, 1st Marine Division (redesignated Transport Company, 7th Motor Transport Battalion, Force Logistics Command).

While serving in Vietnam, he participated in numerous combat operations including Operation Deckhouse I and Joint Operation Nathan Hale with Army, Navy, and Air Force, at Song Cau District; Operation Deckhouse II and Operation Hastings in Quang Tri Province; Operation Colorado and Operation Napa at Tam-Ky Province; Operation Desoto near Quang Ngai; and in action against enemy forces at Da Nang.

Upon his return to the United States, he served his last tour of duty as a postal clerk with Headquarters Company, Headquarters Battalion, 5th Marine Division, Camp Pendleton, California. While stationed at Camp Pendleton, he was promoted to Sergeant on December 1, 1967. He was discharged from active duty on April 5, 1968, and received the Medal of Honor from President Lyndon B. Johnson on May 14, 1968.

In 1970, he re-enlisted in the Marine Corps and was promoted to a final rank of Master Sergeant during his 21-year career. He retired on October 27, 1988.

== Personal life ==
He married Geraldine with whom he had three girls. He had a daughter from his second marriage. He later married Patricia, who survived him.

After his retirement, he resided in Stockton, California until his death on October 13, 2016, at the age of 71.

AmVets Post 1947 in Stockton is named for Pittman, as is Pittman Charter School of the Stockton Unified School District. The latter had a small memorial in its lobby as of 2018.

In December 2022, a new Veterans Affairs clinic in French Camp was designated the Richard A. Pittman VA Clinic.

In December 2024 a segment of Interstate 5 in San Joaquin County, California was designated the Master Sergeant Richard Pittman Memorial Highway.

== Awards and decorations ==
Master Sergeant Pittman's awards include:

Medal of Honor
Combat Action Ribbon
Marine Corps Good Conduct Medal
National Defense Service Medal
Vietnam Service Medal (with two bronze stars)
Republic of Vietnam Campaign Medal

== Medal of Honor citation ==
The President of the United States takes pleasure in presenting the MEDAL OF HONOR to

SERGEANT RICHARD A. PITTMAN
UNITED STATES MARINE CORPS

for service as set forth in the following citation:

For conspicuous gallantry and intrepidity at the risk of his life above and beyond the call of duty as a member of First Platoon, Company I, Third Battalion, Fifth Marines during combat operations near the Demilitarized Zone, Republic of Vietnam. On July 24, 1966, while Company I was conducting an operation along the axis of a narrow jungle trail, the leading company elements suffered numerous casualties when they suddenly came under heavy fire from a well concealed and numerically superior enemy force. Hearing the engaged Marines' calls for more firepower, Sergeant (then Lance Corporal) Pittman quickly exchanged his rifle for a machine gun and several belts of ammunition, left the relative safety of his platoon, and unhesitatingly rushed forward to aid his comrades. Taken under intense enemy small-arms fire at point blank range during his advance, he returned the fire, silencing the enemy positions. As Sergeant Pittman continued to forge forward to aid members of the leading platoon, he again came under heavy fire from two automatic weapons which he promptly destroyed. Learning that there were additional wounded Marines fifty yards further along the trail, he braved a withering hail of enemy mortar and small-arms fire to continue onward. As he reached the position where the leading Marines had fallen, he was suddenly confronted with a bold frontal attack by 30 to 40 enemy. Totally disregarding his own safety, he calmly established a position in the middle of the trail and raked the advancing enemy with devastating machine-gun fire. His weapon rendered ineffective, he picked up a submachine gun and, together with a pistol seized from a fallen comrade, continued his lethal fire until the enemy force had withdrawn. Having exhausted his ammunition except for a grenade which he hurled at the enemy, he then rejoined his own platoon. Sergeant Pittman's daring initiative, bold fighting spirit and selfless devotion to duty inflicted many enemy casualties, disrupted the enemy attack and saved the lives of many of his wounded comrades. His personal valor at grave risk to himself reflects the highest credit upon himself, the Marine Corps and the United States Naval Service.

/S/ LYNDON B. JOHNSON

== See also ==
- List of Medal of Honor recipients
- List of Medal of Honor recipients for the Vietnam War
