= Service number =

Identification number used in formal groups

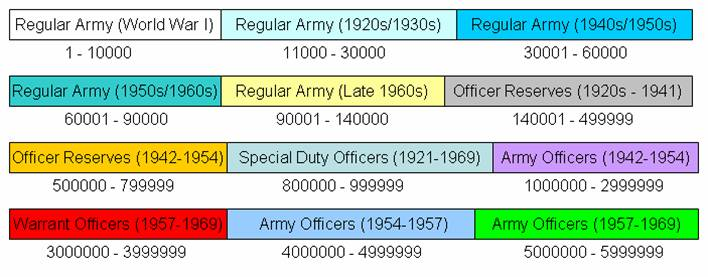
Example of Army Officer Service Number Chart

A service number or roll number is an identification code used to identify a person within a large group. Service numbers are most often associated with the military; however, they also may be used in civilian organizations. National identification numbers may be seen as types of service numbers.

The term "serial number" is often seen as a synonym of service number; however, a serial number more accurately describes manufacture and product codes, rather than personnel identification. In the Canadian military, a "serial number" referred to a unique number assigned each unit that mobilized for the Second World War.

== Australia ==
In the First Australian Imperial Force soldiers were allotted numbers known as regimental numbers. These were allotted to NCOs and other ranks but not to officers or nurses, who had no numbers. Regimental numbers were rarely unique. Each battalion or corps had its own sequence, usually starting at 1, although some units were formed in the field and this did not occur. The result was that several dozen soldiers had the prestigious number 1, which was usually given to the Regimental Sergeant Major or the Regimental Quartermaster Sergeant. When soldiers were transferred from one unit to another, they often kept their number if it was not already held by someone else. Otherwise, they might be allotted a new number or the letter A or B might be added to make the number unique with their unit again. Re-enlisted soldiers often used the additional letter R. In 1917, the AIF switched to a scheme whereby reinforcements were drawn from the common pool instead of being supplied on a per-unit or corps basis. These were known as "general reinforcements" and they were allotted unique numbers in the range of 50000–80000. Despite the limitations of the scheme, in researching a soldier, it is handy to know the regimental number.

In 1921, the assignment of identifying numbers based on regiments was abolished in the Australian Army and replaced with an Army-wide system. This meant that soldiers in all branches of the Army received a unique number, and if they re-enlisted they kept their previously allocated number.

The problems inherent in the First World War scheme were acknowledged and all members of the Second Australian Imperial Force were allocated a unique service number known as an Army number. The first letter represented the state of enlistment: N: New South Wales; V: Victoria; Q: Queensland; S: South Australia; W: Western Australia; T: Tasmania; D: Northern Territory. The serial numbers of female soldiers followed this with an F. AIF serial number then had an X. A low number indicated an early enlistment. General Sir Thomas Blamey was VX1. Soldiers transferring from the Militia often kept their old number with 100,000 added, while PMF officers had 200,000 added.

Following the Second World War, the system employed by the Australian Army was quite complex, as the Second AIF was disbanded and an Interim Army was established. A dual system existed until July 1947 as existing personnel kept their Second AIF numbers until that point, while new enlistments received a service number starting from X500000, while maintaining the state-based prefix of the old Second AIF system. For the second half of 1947, numbers were allocated starting from X700000, again prefixed with the state of recruitment. However, from September 1947, another system based on military districts was introduced for members of the Australian Regular Army, while personnel who enlisted specifically for service during the Korean War with K-Force received numbers beginning from 400,000, although those who volunteered for service with the Regular Army Supplement received a new number beginning with 900,000 and others who transferred from the Interim Army to K-Force received a new number beginning with 905,000, beginning with a number from 1 to 8 representing each state and territory (beginning with Queensland), including Papua New Guinea. This system (the 900,000 series) remained in use until 2002, when it was replaced with an integrated system based on the Personnel Management Key Solution (PMKeyS) system, which moved the Australian Defence Force away from service numbers to employee numbers.

== Canada ==
Canada began using "Regimental Numbers" during the First World War.

During the Second World War, units were allocated blocks of Regimental Numbers to issue out, usually in the 5 or 6 digit range, though extremely low numbers were also possible due to the blocks.

- X12345: the X was an alphabetic character denoting the Military District the soldier was recruited in (A represented MD1, B MD2, etc.) Up until 1945, officers never received numbers and were identified by name and rank only.

The Social Insurance Number (SIN) replaced the regimental number in the 1960s.

- 123 456 789

The SIN was itself replaced by a Service Number in the 1990s.

- X12 345 678

The use of the SIN was granted by Revenue Canada to the CF for service numbers as a temporary measure and was revoked in the 1990s. The new Service Number used a random alphabetic letter and 8 numbers in the same format as SINs to avoid changing service forms.

== Hong Kong ==
Current officers of the Hong Kong Police use a 5 digit number and are worn by all ranks below senior officers.

The same numbering pattern is used by the Hong Kong Correctional Services and the Hong Kong Fire Services.

== United Kingdom ==
Soldiers in the British Army are given an eight-digit number, e.g. 25232301. Prior to 1920, each regiment issued their own service numbers which were unique only within that regiment, so the same number could be issued many times in different regiments. When a serviceman moved, he would be given a new service number by his new regiment. Commissioned officers did not have service numbers until 1920. The modern system was introduced by Army Order 338 dated 9 August 1920. Numbers were then a maximum of seven digits, later groups of numbers up to eight digits were added.

For example:

Royal Army Service Corps: 1 to 294000
Lancers: 309001 to 386000
Royal Corps of Signals: 2303001 to 2604000
Royal Electrical and Mechanical Engineers: 16000001 to 16100000

Until 1960, National Servicemen who voluntarily remained in the Armed Forces continued to use their National Service numbers. Until 2007 and the introduction of the Joint Personnel Administration (JPA) system, Army Officers were issued with a six-digit Personal Number, as opposed to the eight-digit Army Number for enlisted personnel. Newly commissioned officers now receive an eight-digit service number, but six-digit Officers' Personal Numbers issued prior to the introduction of JPA remained unchanged.

In the Royal Navy, prior to the introduction of JPA, service numbers were also of eight digits but began and ended with a letter, depending initially on the depot where the sailor was recruited. The first letter designators were: P (Portsmouth), C (Chatham), and D (Devonport), with the final letter being a checksum. Later, the designators were reassigned and were used to distinguish between men and women within the Royal Navy as well as to distinguish between officers and ratings. A service number beginning with D designated a Royal Navy male rating, W a Royal Navy female rating, C male officers, and V female officers. P designated a Royal Marines other rank, while N a Royal Marine officer. Following the introduction of JPA, all newly issued Royal Navy service numbers became an eight-digit number format beginning with 3, with no distinction made between male, female, ratings, officers, and Royal Marines.

== United States ==
The Armed forces of the United States introduced service numbers in 1918, and discontinued their use in 1974. In 2011, the Department of Defense began implementing a new service number system in order to reduce identity theft. The first U.S. military member to hold a service number was Arthur Crean.

The following formats were used to denote U.S. military service numbers:

- 12-345-678: United States Army enlisted service numbers and United States Air Force enlisted service numbers
- 123-45-67: United States Navy enlisted service numbers
- 1234-567: United States Coast Guard enlisted service numbers
- 123456: United States Marine Corps enlisted service numbers
- 12345: Service number format for most U.S. military officers

Social Security Numbers are today used as the primary means to identify members of the U.S. military. The common format for social security numbers is 123–45–6789.

Effective June 2011, the US military has introduced a plan to eliminate the use of Social Security Numbers on military and dependent ID cards and replace them with a service number, in an effort to prevent identity theft against members of the armed services. All members have now been issued a DoD ID number for this purpose.
