= Service number (United States Army) =

Used by the United States Army from 1918 until 1969

A military service number of the Regular Army

Service numbers were used by the United States Army from 1918 until 1969. Prior to this, the Army relied on muster rolls as a means of indexing enlisted service members while officers were usually listed on yearly rolls maintained by the United States War Department. In the nineteenth century, the Army also used pay records as a primary means of identifying service members after discharge.

== World War I ==
The first service number of the United States armed forces

The Army first began using service numbers (SNs) in 1918 as a result of the United States' involvement in World War I and the need for a record tracking system capable of indexing the millions of soldiers who were joining the ranks of the National Army. Prior to this time, the only way to index lists of soldiers was by use of their legal names on rosters and muster rolls. As the strength of the National Army rose into the millions, this old method of muster rolls and rosters became outdated and a new system had to be developed.

The decision to create service numbers was made in February 1918, with the first service numbers to be issued only to Army enlisted personnel; the Army officer corps was still relatively small, and the U.S. Navy still maintained ships' rosters to keep track of its personnel. The U.S. Marine Corps and U.S. Coast Guard were also relatively small, and likewise without the need for a service number system to track personnel.

=== Enlisted men ===
The first soldier to receive an Army service number was Master Sergeant Arthur Crean, who received service number "1" in February 1918. Throughout the remainder of World War I, service numbers were issued both newly and retroactively to most enlisted personnel with the numbers eventually ranging from 1 to 5 999 999.

== Interwar period ==
=== Enlisted men ===
Enlisted service numbers continued where the World War I numbers had left off. Between 1919 and mid-1940, they ranged from 6 000 000 to 7 099 999. Enlisted personnel who were World War I veterans continued to hold their pre-6 million series service numbers. In 1920, the Army introduced the first service number prefix, which was a letter placed in front of the service number to provide additional information about the soldier. The prefix R identified personnel who had reenlisted into the Regular Army after the end of the war and the disbandment of the National Army. Arthur Crean was also the first person to receive a service number prefix, and his new service number became R-1. The Army also created an F prefix for those who had served as World War I field clerks.

=== Officers ===
In 1920, the Army began issuing service numbers to officers. The first officer service number was given to John J. Pershing, who held service number 1 with the prefix O, making his service number O-1.

Officers' serial numbers were generally determined simply by seniority and entry date into the Army officer corps; between 1921 and 1935, Regular Army officer numbers ranged from 1 to 19 999, with United States Military Academy (West Point) graduates in the 1920s and 1930s receiving numbers in the 20 000 to 50 000 range. Officers of the Organized Reserve and National Guard received numbers in an arbitrary but generally-increasing manner in the range of 140 000 or higher, and in 1935, the Army extended this sequence to 499 999. In 1935, the Army also created a second officer prefix, AO, intended for Regular Army officers who were aviators in the Army Air Corps.

== World War II ==
By 1940, it was obvious to most in the U.S. military establishment that America might soon be involved in a major war. To that end, conscription was introduced in fall 1940 and the Army of the United States was activated as an augmentation force to serve in the coming war in a similar manner to the World War I National Army.

=== Enlisted men ===
In anticipation of a vast number of personnel again entering the Army ranks, a major expansion to the service number system was instituted in mid-1940. Originally, it was intended to simply continue the service number sequence, with new numbers starting at 8 000 000. The Army, however, chose to start a new number series at 10 000 000, with the eight and nine million-series being reserved for special uses; eight million series service numbers would later be used strictly by female Army personnel, while the nine million series service numbers were never issued.

Service numbers for Regular Army and Army of the United States voluntary enlistees began at 10 000 000 and extended to 19 999 999. The 11 000 000 through 19 999 999 series was issued to enlisted personnel who had enlisted within the boundaries of the 48 contiguous states and the territory of Alaska after 1 July 1940. The second number was determined by what corps area a person entered service from, while the next six identified the individual; thus, for each geographical area there was an available range of 999,999 service numbers. A subset of this series was reserved solely for enlistees from recruiting stations outside of the 48 contiguous U.S. states. The first number after the "ten" indicated the geographical region from which a person had enlisted, with the remaining numbers as a personal identification number. The geographical codes were 10 1 (for Hawaii Territory), 10 2 (for the Panama Canal Zone), 10 3 (for the Philippines) and 10 4 (for Puerto Rico). The remaining number codes (5, 6, 7, 8, 9, and 0) were unassigned and used by various recruiting stations outside the United States, including for men serving in the armed forces of allied nations who were formally transferred into the United States Army.

A wartime Army of the United States voluntary enlistee service number, used by a member of the Army Air Forces during World War II

The geographical number codes were as follows:

| Code | State |
|---|---|
| 11 | Connecticut, Maine, Massachusetts, New Hampshire, Rhode Island, Vermont |
| 12 | Delaware, New Jersey, New York |
| 13 | Maryland, Pennsylvania, Virginia, Washington, D.C. |
| 14 | Alabama, Florida, Georgia, Mississippi, North Carolina, South Carolina, Tennessee |
| 15 | Indiana, Kentucky, Ohio, West Virginia |
| 16 | Illinois, Michigan, Wisconsin |
| 17 | Colorado, Iowa, Kansas, Minnesota, Missouri, Nebraska, North Dakota, South Dakota, Wyoming |
| 18 | Arkansas, Louisiana, New Mexico, Oklahoma, Texas |
| 19 | Alaska, Arizona, California, Idaho, Montana, Nevada, Oregon, Utah, Washington |

Beginning in Fall 1940 and continuing until Fall 1941, the Army federalized the National Guard to augment the growing Army of the United States. Previously, there was no established procedure to issue service numbers to National Guard enlisted men in state service, since the vast majority had served solely under the authority of their state governments. Federalized National Guardsmen were given service numbers in the 20 million range, with numbers ranging from 20 000 000 to 20 999 999. Guardsmen federalized from Hawaii were issued service numbers beginning with 20 01 while the 20 02 series was used by men from Puerto Rico. With the exceptions of Hawaii and Puerto Rico, the first three numbers corresponded to a person's corps area, and the last five were a personal identifier. The geographical codes were as follows:

| Code | State |
|---|---|
| 20 1 | Connecticut, Maine, Massachusetts, New Hampshire, Rhode Island, Vermont |
| 20 2 | Delaware, New Jersey, New York |
| 20 3 | Maryland, Pennsylvania, Virginia, Washington, D.C. |
| 20 4 | Alabama, Florida, Georgia, Mississippi, North Carolina, South Carolina, Tennessee |
| 20 5 | Indiana, Kentucky, Ohio, West Virginia |
| 20 6 | Illinois, Michigan, Wisconsin |
| 20 7 | Colorado, Iowa, Kansas, Minnesota, Missouri, Nebraska, North Dakota, South Dakota, Wyoming |
| 20 8 | Arkansas, Louisiana, New Mexico, Oklahoma, Texas |
| 20 9 | Alaska, Arizona, California, Idaho, Montana, Nevada, Oregon, Utah, Washington |

Conscripts into the Army of the United States were issued service numbers in the 30 million range, ranging from 30 000 000 to 39 999 999. The second number again corresponded with the corps area where a person had entered service, and the last six were a personal identifier. The geographical codes were as follows:

| Code | State or territory |
|---|---|
| 30 | was reserved for those who had been drafted from outside the United States |
| 30 1 | (Hawaii) |
| 30 2 | (Panama Canal Zone) |
| 30 3 | (the Philippines) |
| 30 4 | (Puerto Rico) |
| 31 | Connecticut, Maine, Massachusetts, New Hampshire, Rhode Island, Vermont |
| 32 | Delaware, New Jersey, New York |
| 33 | Maryland, Pennsylvania, Virginia, Washington, D.C. |
| 34 | Alabama, Florida, Georgia, Mississippi, North Carolina, South Carolina, Tennessee |
| 35 | Indiana, Kentucky, Ohio, West Virginia |
| 36 | Illinois, Michigan, Wisconsin |
| 37 | Colorado, Iowa, Kansas, Minnesota, Missouri, Nebraska, North Dakota, South Dakota, Wyoming |
| 38 | Arkansas, Louisiana, New Mexico, Oklahoma, Texas |
| 39 | Alaska, Arizona, California, Idaho, Montana, Nevada, Oregon, Utah, Washington |

The 30 code was reserved for those who had been drafted from outside the United States with the third number following the "30" determining the extra-US draft location; the codes established were 30 1 (Hawaii), 30 2 (Panama Canal Zone), 30 3 (the Philippines), and 30 4 (Puerto Rico).

In 1942, the Army expanded the enlisted conscript service numbers and created the forty million service number series (40 000 000 to 49 999 999). These numbers were to be used for persons drafted from corps areas that had exceeded their initially allotted 999,999 numbers. In all, the only forty million series numbers that were ever issued ranged from 42 000 000 to 46 999 999. The forty million series numbers were discontinued after World War II and never reused.

A final service number series of World War II was the ninety-million series (90 000 000 to 99 999 999) which was reserved for members of the Philippine Army who had been called up to serve in the ranks of the U.S. Army. These numbers were rarely issued and the ninety million series was permanently discontinued after World War II.

During World War II, the Army also expanded the service number prefixes in addition to the original three prefixes (R, F, and O) which had been created after World War I. In all, the following prefixes were used during World War II.

| Code | Used by |
|---|---|
| A | female members of the Women's Army Corps |
| F | field clerks during the First World War |
| K | female reserve and specialist officers with service numbers 100 001 and higher |
| L | enlisted members of the Women's Army Corps |
| N | female nurse officers |
| O | officers of the Regular Army |
| R | enlisted personnel with service #s from 1 to 5 999 999 upon reenlistment of the Army |
| T | flight officers appointed from an enlisted status |
| V | officers of the Women's Army Corps |
| W | warrant officers of the Regular Army |

=== Officers ===
In 1942, officer service numbers were extended again to 3 000 000. The service numbers 800 000 through 999 999 were reserved for officers with special duties, while higher service numbers were held by graduates of Officer Candidate Schools or those who had been directly commissioned from the enlisted ranks. The Army also discontinued the prefix O, establishing that all officer numbers would begin with a zero. For instance, an officer with the service number O-2 345 678 would have the number written in military records as 02 345 678.

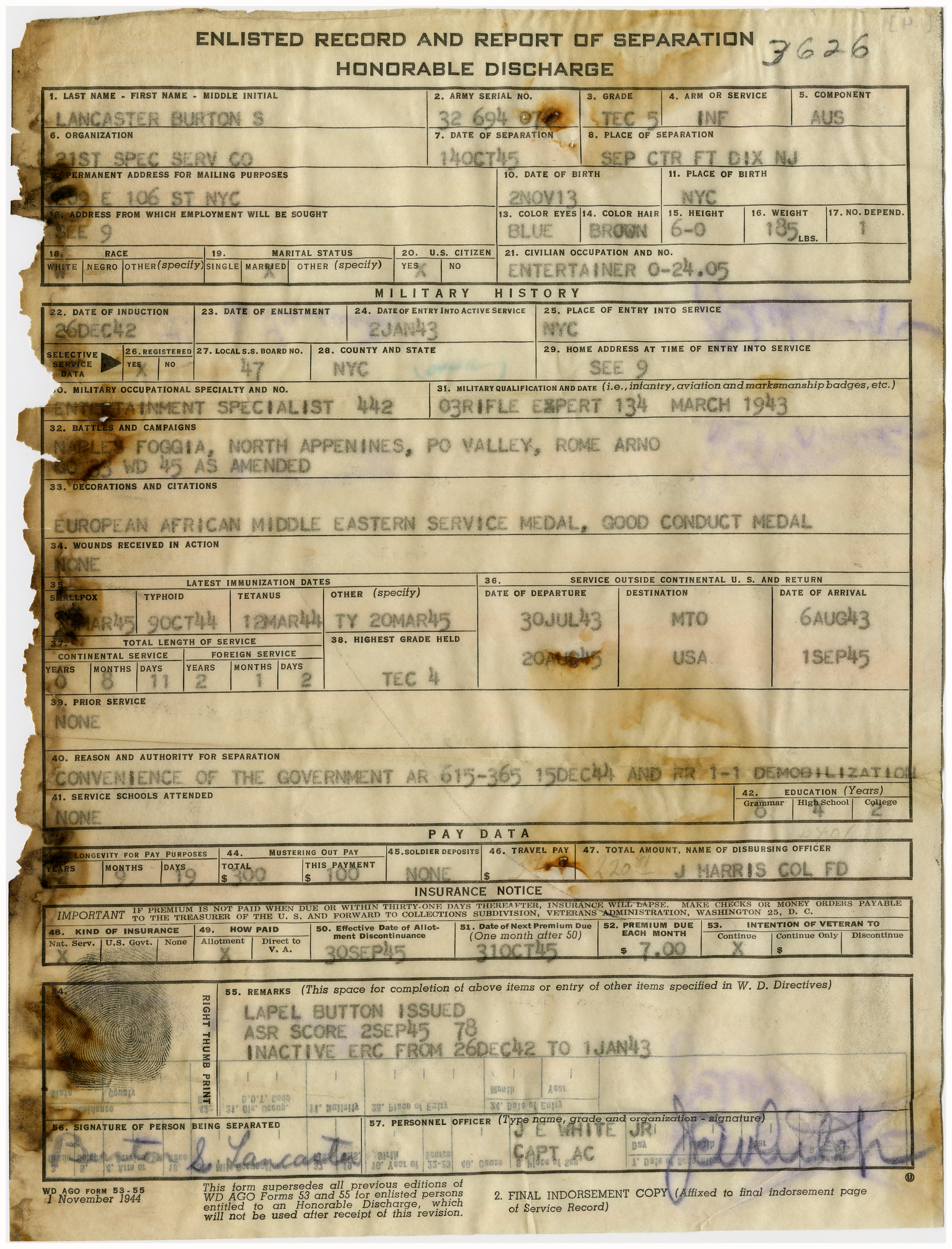
The Discharge Certificate of Burt Lancaster showing his thirty million series draft service number with a geographical code of 32 (entrance from New York). The burned edges are the result of the National Personnel Records Center fire of 1973.

=== After the war ===
In October 1945, the Army discontinued the prefix "R" and issued the prefix "RA" to all members of the Regular Army. At the same time, the Army added several other R series prefixes to deal with special enlisted situations. In all, the R prefix series was:

| Code | Used by |
|---|---|
| RA | enlisted personnel of the Regular Army |
| RM | enlisted personnel holding temporary appointments as warrant officers of the Regular Army |
| RO | enlisted personnel holding temporary reserve officer commissions of the Regular Army |
| RP | retired enlisted personnel recalled to active duty |
| RV | female warrant officers granted reserve commissioned officer billets |
| RW | male warrant officers granted reserve commissioned officer billets |

After World War II, the Army of the United States was demobilized and the thirty and forty million series numbers were discontinued. Personnel of the Regular Army continued to be cycled through the 10–19 million series while Army officers continued to be issued numbers determined by date of commission. By the end of the 1940s, the 3,000,000 service number cap for officers had yet to be reached.

== Post-WWII and Korean War service numbers ==
Between 1945 and 1947, the World War II draft force was slowly disbanded as its members left service, and new issue of the 30 and 40 million service number series was formally discontinued. The Regular Army service number system, ranging from 10 to 19 million, remained unchanged.

Personnel who chose to remain on active duty or reenlisted kept their original service numbers from their previous service, regardless of their component (Regular Army, Army Reserve, Army of the United States, or National Guard. The United States Air Force was also founded in September 1947; enlisted personnel transferred into the new organization kept their old Army service numbers, while officers were either issued a new number or kept their Army number as well. In 1948, the Army opened up the 50 million service number series. These numbers were assigned to personnel who were either drafted into the Army of the United States or who enlisted into the Army Reserve. As with the older 30 million numbers, the first two numbers were determined by the geographical region from which a soldier was drafted or had enlisted. Numbers beginning with "50" specified an entry location outside the United States with 50 0' reserved for Hawaii, 50 1 reserved for Panama and Puerto Rico, and 50 2 reserved for Alaska. Within the United States, the geographical codes were:

| Code | State |
|---|---|
| 50 0 | Hawaii |
| 50 1 | Panama, Puerto Rico |
| 50 2 | Alaska |
| 51 | Connecticut, Delaware, Maine, Massachusetts, New Hampshire, New Jersey, New York, Rhode Island, Vermont |
| 52 | Indiana, Kentucky, Maryland, Ohio, Pennsylvania, Virginia, West Virginia |
| 53 | Alabama, Florida, Georgia, Mississippi, North Carolina, South Carolina, Tennessee |
| 54 | Arkansas, Louisiana, New Mexico, Oklahoma, Texas |
| 55 | Colorado, Illinois, Iowa, Kansas, Michigan, Minnesota, Missouri, Nebraska, North Dakota, South Dakota, Wisconsin, Wyoming |
| 56 | Arizona, California, Idaho, Montana, Nevada, Oregon, Utah, Washington |
| 57 | not assigned a specific geographical region and were used for enlisted personnel in the Army Reserve or those assigned to special duties |
| 58 | not assigned a specific geographical region and were used for enlisted personnel in the Army Reserve or those assigned to special duties |
| 59 | not assigned a specific geographical region and were used for enlisted personnel in the Army Reserve or those assigned to special duties |

Service numbers beginning with 57, 58, and 59 were not assigned a specific geographical region and were used for enlisted personnel in the Army Reserve or those assigned to special duties. When the Korean War began in 1950, this service number system was used throughout the conflict and through the remainder of the 1950s.

Officers' service numbers during this period ranged from 50 000 to 500 000 (set aside for West Point graduates and Regular Army officers) and 500 001 to 3 000 000 (used by reserve and direct appointment officers). All officer service numbers by this point were preceded by a zero.

== Vietnam era service numbers ==
In 1954, one year after the close of the Korean War, the Army extended the range of officer service numbers by adding the three and four million series. The new officer service numbers ranged from 1 000 000 to 4 999 999; service numbers from 800 000 to 999 999 were still being used for special duty officers. In 1957, officer numbers were extended again this time to 5 999 999. It was also declared that the three million numbers (3 000 000 – 3 999 999) would only be issued to warrant officers. Service numbers below 500 000 were only issued to West Point graduates and other Regular Officers. By 1969, the highest service number issued to a West Point graduate was slightly above 120 000.

Enlisted service numbers during this post-Korea/pre-Vietnam era remained unchanged with the Regular Army continuing to cycle through the 10 – 19 million series while the draft force was assigned service numbers in the 50 to 59 million range. In 1966, with the increased US involvement of the Vietnam War, the Army realized that many more troops would be needed. The service number system had to be expanded, which resulted in the Army activating the 60 million enlisted service number series in 1967. Officer service numbers remained unchanged.

The new enlisted service numbers applied only to those drafted and ranged from 60 000 000 to 69 999 999 with the first two numbers a recruiting code and the last six a personal identifier. At the same time, there were still a wide variety of older enlisted numbers still active, ranging back to the thirty million series used during World War II.

By 1968, the Army had also declared the final version of service number prefixes. The most common prefixes were the following two letter codes:

| Code | Used by |
|---|---|
| ER | enlisted members of the Army Reserve |
| FR | some reservists of the Army Reserve from the late 1940s through 1962 |
| KF | female officers of the Regular Army |
| NG | enlisted personnel of the National Guard |
| OF | male officers of the Regular Army |
| UR | draft personnel appointed as officers in the Regular Army |
| US | conscripted enlisted personnel |

The following special prefixes for medical personnel were also declared during the mid-1960s:

| Code | Used by | Time |
|---|---|---|
| MJ | Occupational Therapist Officers | mid-1960s |
| MM | Physical Therapist Officers | mid-1960s |
| MN | male members of the Army Nurse Corps | mid-1960s |
| MR | enlisted dieticians of the Army | mid-1960s |
| O | some specialist officers of the Army | 1960s |
| R | Dietician Officers of the Army | 1960s |
| WA | enlisted members of the Women Army Corps | late 1950s/mid-1960s |
| WL | female Regular Army personnel granted officer commissions in the Army Reserve | late 1950s/mid-1960s |
| WM | female Regular Army personnel granted warrant officer commissions in the Army Reserve | late 1950s/mid-1960s |
| WR | female enlisted reservists attached to the Women Army Corps | late 1950s/mid-1960s |
| RA | enlisted personnel of the Regular Army | |
| RM | enlisted personnel holding temporary appointments as warrant officers of the Regular Army | |
| RO | enlisted personnel holding temporary reserve officer commissions of the Regular Army | |
| RP | retired enlisted personnel recalled to active duty | |
| RV | female warrant officers granted reserve commissioned officer billets | |
| RW | male warrant officers granted reserve commissioned officer billets | |

The Army also used the following one letter prefixes for a brief period of time in the 1960s:

O: Used by some Army specialist officers

R: Used by Army officer dieticians

From the late 1950s to the mid-1960s, the Army also had established the following special prefix codes for female personnel:

WA: Used by enlisted members of the Women Army Corps

WL: Used by female Regular Army personnel granted officer commissions in the Army Reserve

WM: Used by female Regular Army personnel granted warrant officer commissions in the Army Reserve

WR: Used by female enlisted reservists attached to the Women Army Corps

The Regular Army prefix codes RA, RM, RO, RP, RV, and RW remained unchanged from their post World War II origins.

== Discontinuation of Army service numbers ==
In 1968, the Army activated the seventy million series and in 1969 created eighty million numbers as well. The new numbers, which were to be issued only to the enlisted draft force, ranged from 70 000 000 to 89 999 999. By this time, however, service numbers had been informally discontinued and most military records used Social Security numbers to identify the service member. As a result, on July 1, 1969, service numbers were declared discontinued and no 70 or 80 million series numbers were ever issued.

It was not recorded who exactly held the last service number of the United States Army. The highest service number for the draft force was in the 68 million range; however, since Social Security numbers were being commonly used instead of service numbers, the identity of the soldier who held this number is unknown. The Regular Army, which had issued service numbers by geographical codes since World War II, had several numbers which could be interpreted as the final service number of the 10–19 million series.

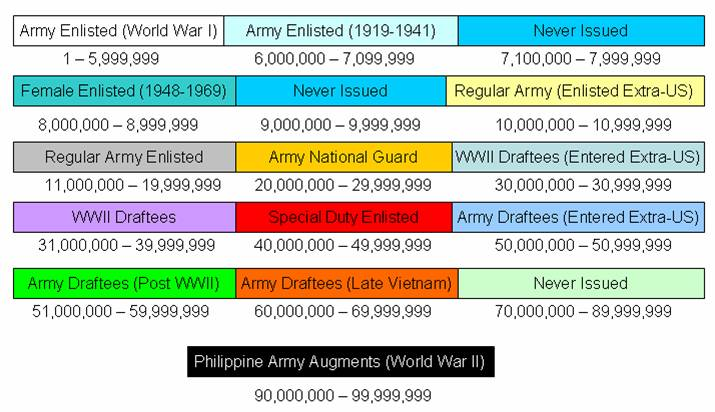
Final distribution of Army enlisted service numbers

The highest Army officer service numbers were issued slightly above 05 850 999 although there are no clear records of who held these final numbers, again due to Social Security numbers being used for record keeping instead of service numbers. The last Regular Army service number was somewhere in the 130 000 to 140 000 range.

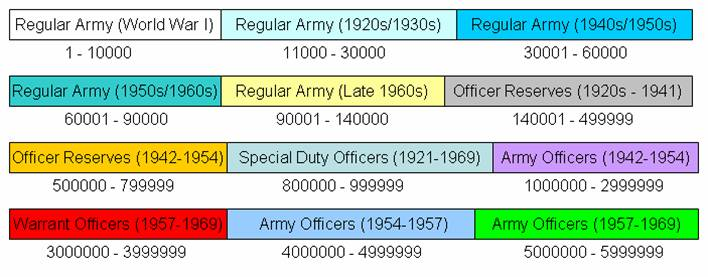
Final distribution of Army officer service numbers

After 1969, the Army completely converted to Social Security numbers for the identification of military personnel.

== Social Security Numbers Discontinued ==
In December 2015, a U.S. Army press release announced that the Army was phasing out the use of soldiers' Social Security numbers on their dog tags. Instead it would use the soldiers' Department of Defense Identification Numbers, which are randomly-generated 10-digit numbers. The change would not happen all at once; it was being implemented "on an as-needed basis."

== Geographical Codes and Regular Army Distribution ==
State Geographical Codes were used as the first two numbers of an Army or Air Force enlisted service number to indicate where a soldier had entered the U.S. military. For instance, the service number "12 345 678" would have a geographical code of 12 and a personal identification number of 345,678. A comparison of the state codes between the Regular Army, World War II draft force, and Korea/Vietnam draft force is as follows:

| State | Regular Army Code | World War II Code | Korean/Vietnam War Code |
|---|---|---|---|
| Alabama | 14 | 34 | 53 |
| Alaska | 19 | 39 | 50 2 |
| Arizona | 19 | 39 | 56 |
| Arkansas | 18 | 38 | 54 |
| California | 19 | 39 | 56 |
| Colorado | 17 | 37 | 55 |
| Connecticut | 11 | 31 | 51 |
| Delaware | 12 | 32 | 51 |
| Florida | 14 | 34 | 53 |
| Georgia | 14 | 34 | 56 |
| Hawaii | 10 1 | 20 1 | 50 0 |
| Illinois | 16 | 36 | 55 |
| Idaho | 19 | 39 | 56 |
| Indiana | 15 | 35 | 52 |
| Iowa | 17 | 37 | 55 |
| Kansas | 17 | 37 | 55 |
| Kentucky | 15 | 35 | 52 |
| Louisiana | 18 | 38 | 54 |
| Maine | 11 | 31 | 51 |
| Maryland | 13 | 33 | 52 |
| Massachusetts | 11 | 31 | 51 |
| Michigan | 16 | 36 | 55 |
| Minnesota | 17 | 37 | 55 |
| Mississippi | 14 | 34 | 53 |
| Missouri | 17 | 37 | 55 |
| Montana | 19 | 39 | 56 |
| Nebraska | 17 | 37 | 55 |
| Nevada | 19 | 39 | 56 |
| New Hampshire | 11 | 31 | 51 |
| New Jersey | 12 | 32 | 51 |
| New Mexico | 18 | 38 | 54 |
| New York | 12 | 32 | 51 |
| North Carolina | 14 | 34 | 53 |
| North Dakota | 17 | 37 | 55 |
| Ohio | 15 | 35 | 52 |
| Oklahoma | 18 | 38 | 54 |
| Oregon | 19 | 39 | 56 |
| Pennsylvania | 13 | 33 | 52 |
| Rhode Island | 11 | 31 | 51 |
| South Carolina | 14 | 34 | 53 |
| South Dakota | 17 | 37 | 55 |
| Tennessee | 14 | 34 | 53 |
| Texas | 18 | 38 | 54 |
| Utah | 19 | 39 | 56 |
| Vermont | 11 | 31 | 51 |
| Virginia | 13 | 33 | 52 |
| Washington | 19 | 39 | 56 |
| West Virginia | 15 | 35 | 52 |
| Wisconsin | 16 | 36 | 55 |
| Wyoming | 17 | 37 | 55 |

In 1940, when the United States Army expanded its service numbers beyond ten million, the range of 10 000 000 to 10 999 999 was reserved for Regular Army enlisted personnel who joined from recruiting stations outside the United States. With 999,999 service numbers available in this range, the Regular Army was able to issue service numbers to extra-US enlistees, without repeating numbers, until the disestablishment of service numbers in 1969.

The remaining range of 11 000 000 to 19 999 999 was reserved for Regular Army personnel who enlisted from within the United States with the first two numbers a geographical code and the last six a personal identifier. This gave geographical recruiting areas 999,999 service numbers a piece to allocate to new recruits. The Army directed that every effort should be made to avoid repeating service numbers and allocated only a certain block of numbers for certain time periods of enlistments. The matter was made even more complicated when the Regular Air Force came into being in 1947, also with instructions that the 11–19 million service numbers should not be repeated nor should an Air Force service member be given a service numbers already held by a Regular Army soldier.

In general, both the Army and Air Force made every effort to avoid repeating service numbers although some mistakes did occur. The final breakdown of Regular Army service numbers by time period was as follows:

| Geographical Code | Allocated Numbers (1940–1945) | Allocated Numbers (1946–1948) | Allocated Numbers (1949–1960) | Allocated Numbers (1961–1969) |
|---|---|---|---|---|
| 11 | 000 000 – 142 500 | 142 501 – 188 000 | 188 001 – 384 000 | 384 000 – 999 999 |
| 12 | 000 000 – 242 000 | 242 001 – 321 000 | 321 001 – 614 900 | 614 901 – 999 999 |
| 13 | 000 000 – 197 500 | 197 501 – 299 700 | 299 701 – 705 500 | 705 501 – 999 999 |
| 14 | 000 000 – 204 500 | 204 501 – 300 770 | 300 771 – 745 000 | 745 001 – 999 999 |
| 15 | 000 000 – 201 000 | 201 001 – 280 500 | 280 501 – 639 615 | 639 616 – 999 999 |
| 16 | 000 000 – 201 500 | 201 501 – 307 000 | 307 001 – 683 100 | 683 101 – 999 999 |
| 17 | 000 000 – 183 500 | 183 501 – 254 500 | 254 501 – 592 940 | 592 941 – 999 999 |
| 18 | 000 000 – 247 100 | 247 101 – 546 000 | 546 001 – 607 725 | 607 726 – 999 999 |
| 19 | 000 000 – 235 500 | 235 501 – 420 000 | 420 001 – 597 661 | 597 662 – 999 999 |

Draft force service numbers in the 30 and 50 million range also used geographical codes but were free to use all 999,999 possible personal identification numbers for the entire period of the draft. The 30 million series was used for World War II draftees and the 50 million for the Korean War and early Vietnam. The 60 million series of the late Vietnam War was issued without restriction.

Basic Training soldiers on July 1, 1969, were required to memorize both the Service Number and the Social Security number to accommodate the changeover to using only the Social Security number.

== Notable service numbers ==
The following service numbers have been held by some of the more famous veterans of the United States Army:

- R-1: Arthur Crean
- O-1: John J. Pershing
- O-2: Leonard Wood
- O-57: Douglas MacArthur
- O-668: Charles F. Humphrey
- O-2605: George S. Patton
- O-3822: Dwight Eisenhower
- O-5284: Norman Cota
- O-12043: Leslie Groves
- O-20362: William P. Yarborough
- O-143128: Archibald Roosevelt
- O-565390: Clark Gable
- O-662062: Gene Roddenberry
- 073 858: Norman Schwarzkopf, Jr.
- 0 357 403: Ronald Reagan
- 0 765 497: Russell Johnson
- 05 242 035: Homer Hickam
- 2371377: Ian Wolfe
- 32 325 070: Burl Ives
- 32 694 076: Burt Lancaster
- 32 698 169: Nehemiah Persoff
- 32 726 378: Charles Durning
- 32 738 306: Rod Serling
- 32 980 601: Karl Malden
- 33 455 116: William Windom
- 35 425 274: Basil Plumley
- 35 756 363: Don Knotts
- 36 896 415: Eddie Slovik
- 39 531 145: Elisha Cook, Jr.
- 39 563 856: DeForest Kelley
- 39 744 068: Robert Mitchum
- ER 11 229 770: Leonard Nimoy
- ER 11 530 137: Todd Akin
- NG 28 296 022: Brion James
- US 51 214 821: Richard Herd
- US 52 314 745: Frank Gorshin
- US 52 346 646: Robert Duvall
- US 53 310 761: Elvis Presley
- US 54 356 205: Dean Corll

According to U.S. Army records, despite efforts to avoid duplicate service numbers, there have been at least six occurrences of an Army soldier who was issued the service number "12 345 678".

== See also ==
- Service number (United States Armed Forces)

== Sources ==
- National Personnel Records Center, Instruction Memo 1865.20E, "Service Number Information", 14 April 1988
- Military Personnel Records Center, "Training Guide Concerning Military Service Numbers", 28 June 2009
