= Service number (United States Armed Forces) =

Military service number assigned by the United States Armed Forces, 1918–1974

Service numbers were used by the United States Department of Defense as the primary means of service member identification from 1918 until 1974 (and before 1947 by the U.S. Army and U.S. Navy). Service numbers are public information available under the Freedom of Information Act, unlike social security numbers which are protected by the Privacy Act of 1974.

== Usage ==
Each branch of the military service had its own version of service numbers. In order by year of creation, these were:

- United States Army service numbers (1918)
- United States Navy service numbers (1920)
- United States Marine Corps service numbers (1920)
- United States Coast Guard service numbers (1921)
- United States Air Force service numbers (1948)

The following are the original service numbers which were first issued to United States military personnel:

- R-1: Arthur Crean – First service number of the United States armed forces
- O-1: John J. Pershing – First officer service number of the United States Army
- 100 00 01: Clayton Aab — First enlisted service number of the United States Navy
- 532 – Samuel R. Colhoun — Earliest recorded officer service number of the United States Navy
- 01 – James Ackerman – First officer service number of the United States Marine Corps
- 20001 – Alexander Schott — First enlisted service number of the United States Marine Corps
- 1000 – Joseph F. Farley – First officer service number of the United States Coast Guard
- 100000 – Mason B. Herring — First enlisted service number of the United States Coast Guard
- 4A: Hoyt Vandenberg – Earliest recorded officer service number of the United States Air Force

The original Air Force enlisted force was composed of personnel formerly of the United States Army Air Forces who continued to use their Army service numbers upon transfer to the Air Force in 1947. Thus, there is no established "first" enlisted service number of the U.S. Air Force since thousands of airmen simultaneously transferred into the Air Force on 18 September 1947.

Service numbers were eventually phased out completely by the social security number; the Army and Air Force converted to social security numbers on 1 July 1969, the Navy and Marine Corps on 1 January 1972, and the Coast Guard on 1 October 1974. Since that time, social security numbers have become the de facto military service number for United States armed forces personnel.

Beginning in 2002, the military began a further effort to protect the use of social security numbers, even within the military itself. New regulations declared that on all but the most official of documents (such as a DD Form 214 or evaluation reports) social security numbers would only list the last four digits. Regulations also were enacted to redact the social security number of reporting seniors (which were written in their entirety) on the personal copies of evaluation reports given to service members. The reason for this was to prevent possible identity theft issues committed by service members who had received a bad evaluation or who were disgruntled with their commanding officer.

== Format ==
The general design of United States service numbers was created first by the United States Army and later adapted by the other branches of the armed forces. Between each branch, service numbers are assigned differently while some branches make a conscious effort to separate officer and enlisted numbers while others do not. It is therefore common in the U.S. service number system for officers and enlisted personnel to perhaps hold the same service number and even more common for service members from different branches to be assigned the same number as well.

The Army is the only branch of service to begin both officer and enlisted service numbers at No. 1. Marine Corps officer numbers also begin at No. 1 but Marine Corps enlisted numbers start much later at #20,001. There is also no service No. 1 in the Navy, Coast Guard, or Air Force although the earliest recorded Air Force officer number was No. 4.

The entire range of United States service numbers extends from 1 to 99,999,999 with the United States Army and Air Force the only services to use numbers higher than ten million. A special range of numbers from one to seven thousand (1–7000) was also used by the United States Air Force Academy for assignment only to cadets and was not considered part of the regular service number system. Another unique service number series was the National Guard which used service numbers solely in the range of twenty to twenty nine million (20,000,000 – 29,999,999).

Service Number	Army Enlisted	Army Officer	Navy Enlisted	Navy Officer	Air Force Enlisted	Air Force Officer	Marine Enlisted	Marine Officer	Coast Guard Enlisted	Coast Guard Officer
1–100	World War I enlisted personnel	World War I officers	Not issued	Not issued	Not issued	Senior Air Force officers formerly of the Army Air Forces	Not issued	World War I officers	Not issued	Not issued
101–500	World War I enlisted personnel	World War I officers	Not issued	Not issued	Not issued	Senior Air Force officers formerly of the Army Air Forces	Not issued	USMC Officers (1920s)	Not issued	Not issued
501–1000	World War I enlisted personnel	World War I officers	Not issued	Navy Officers (1920)	Not issued	Senior Air Force officers formerly of the Army Air Forces	Not issued	USMC Officers (1920s)	Not issued	Not issued
1001–2000	World War I enlisted personnel	World War I officers	Not issued	Navy Officers (1920s – 1930s)	Not issued	Senior Air Force officers formerly of the Army Air Forces	Not issued	USMC Officers (1930–1941)	Not issued	Regular USCG Officers (1921–1974)
2001 – 10,000	World War I enlisted personnel	World War I officers	Not issued	Navy Officers (1920s – 1930s)	Not issued	Senior Air Force officers formerly of the Army Air Forces	Not issued	USMC Officers (World War II)	Not issued	Regular USCG Officers (1921–1974)
10,001 – 20,000	World War I enlisted personnel	Regular Army officers (1920s/1930s)	B" & "D" Series Numbers (1965–1971)	Navy Officers (1920s – 1930s)	Not issued	Senior Air Force officers formerly of the Army Air Forces	Not issued	USMC Officers (World War II)	Not issued	Regular USCG Officers (1921–1974)
20,001 – 30,000	World War I enlisted personnel	Regular Army officers (1920s/1930s)	B" & "D" Series Numbers (1965–1971)	Navy Officers (1920s – 1930s)	Not issued	Regular USAF Officers (1948–1969)	Retroactive (1905–1917)	USMC Officers (World War II)	Not issued	Reserve/Warrant USCG Officers (1921–1950s)
30,001 – 50,000	World War I enlisted personnel	Regular Army officers (1940s/1950s)	B" & "D" Series Numbers (1965–1971)	Navy Officers (1920s – 1930s)	Not issued	Regular USAF Officers (1948–1969)	Retroactive (1905–1917)	USMC Officers (World War II)	Not issued	Reserve/Warrant USCG Officers (1921–1950s)
50,001 – 60,000	World War I enlisted personnel	Regular Army officers (1940s/1950s)	B" & "D" Series Numbers (1965–1971)	Navy Officers (1920s – 1930s)	Not issued	Regular USAF Officers (1948–1969)	Not issued	USMC Officers (1948–1966)	Not issued	Reserve/Warrant USCG Officers (1921–1950s)
60,001 – 70,000	World War I enlisted personnel	Regular Army officers (1950s/1960s)	B" & "D" Series Numbers (1965–1971)	Navy Officers (1920s – 1930s)	Not issued	Regular USAF Officers (1948–1969)	Retroactive (1905–1919)	USMC Officers (1948–1966)	Not issued	Non-Regular USCG Officers (1950s/1960s)
70,001 – 80,000	World War I enlisted personnel	Regular Army officers (1950s/1960s)	B" & "D" Series Numbers (1965–1971)	Navy Officers (1920s – 1930s)	Not issued	Regular USAF Officers (1948–1969)	Retroactive (1905–1919)	USMC Officers (1948–1966)	Not issued	Non-Regular USCG Officers (1960s/1970s)
80,001 – 90,000	World War I enlisted personnel	Regular Army officers (1950s/1960s)	B" & "D" Series Numbers (1965–1971)	Navy Officers (1920s – 1930s)	Not issued	Regular USAF Officers (1948–1969)	Retroactive (1905–1919)	USMC Officers (1948–1966)	Not issued	"Special Use" service numbers
90,001 – 99,999	World War I enlisted personnel	Regular Army (Late 1960s)	B" & "D" Series Numbers (1965–1971)	Navy Officers (1920s – 1930s)	Not issued	Regular USAF Officers (1948–1969)	Retroactive (1905–1919)	USMC Officers (1948–1966)	Not issued	"Special Use" service numbers
100,000 – 125,000	World War I enlisted personnel	Regular Army (Late 1960s)	B" & "D" Series Numbers (1965–1971)	Navy Officers (1920s – 1930s)	Not issued	Not issued	USMC Enlisted (1920–1935)	USMC Officers (1966–1972)	USCG Enlisted (1920s/1930s)	Not issued
125,001 – 140,000	World War I enlisted personnel	Regular Army (Late 1960s)	B" & "D" Series Numbers (1965–1971)	Navy Officers (World War II)	Not issued	Not issued	USMC Enlisted (1920–1935)	Not issued	USCG Enlisted (1920s/1930s)	Not issued
140,001 – 150,000	World War I enlisted personnel	Officer Reserves (1920s – 1941)	B" & "D" Series Numbers (1965–1971)	Navy Officers (World War II)	Not issued	Not issued	USMC Enlisted (1920–1935)	Not issued	USCG Enlisted (1920s/1930s)	Not issued
150,001 – 200,000	World War I enlisted personnel	Officer Reserves (1920s – 1941)	B" & "D" Series Numbers (1965–1971)	Navy Officers (World War II)	Not issued	Not issued	USMC Enlisted (1920–1935)	Not issued	Retroactive Service Numbers	Not issued
200,001 – 255,000	World War I enlisted personnel	Officer Reserves (1920s – 1941)	B" & "D" Series Numbers (1965–1971)	Navy Officers (World War II)	Not issued	Not issued	USMC Enlisted (1936–1941)	Not issued	USCG Enlisted (World War II)	Not issued
255,001 – 350,000	World War I enlisted personnel	Officer Reserves (1920s – 1941)	B" & "D" Series Numbers (1965–1971)	Navy Officers (World War II)	Not issued	Not issued	USMC Enlisted (1936–1941)	Not issued	USCG Enlisted (1945–1962)	Not issued
350,001 – 500,000	World War I enlisted personnel	Officer Reserves (1920s – 1941)	B" & "D" Series Numbers (1965–1971)	Navy Officers (1945–1955)	Not issued	Not issued	USMC Enlisted (Early World War II)	Not issued	USCG Enlisted (1962–1974)	Not issued
500,001 – 600,000	World War I enlisted personnel	Officer Reserves (1942–1954)	B" & "D" Series Numbers (1965–1971)	Navy Officers (1945–1955)	Not issued	Not issued	USMC Enlisted (Early World War II)	Not issued	USCG Enlisted (World War II)	Not issued
600,001 – 671,000	World War I enlisted personnel	Officer Reserves (1942–1954)	B" & "D" Series Numbers (1965–1971)	Navy Officers (1955–1963)	Not issued	Not issued	USMC Enlisted (Early World War II)	Not issued	USCG Enlisted (World War II)	Not issued
671,001 – 700,000	World War I enlisted personnel	Officer Reserves (1942–1954)	B" & "D" Series Numbers (1965–1971)	Navy Officers (1964–1969)	Not issued	Not issued	Not issued	Not issued	USCG Enlisted (World War II)	Not issued
700,001 – 800,000	World War I enlisted personnel	Officer Reserves (1942–1954)	B" & "D" Series Numbers (1965–1971)	Navy Officers (1964–1969)	Not issued	Not issued	USMC Female Enlisted	Not issued	USCG Enlisted (World War II)	Not issued
800,001 – 1,000,000	World War I enlisted personnel	Special Duty Officers (1921–1969)	B" & "D" Series Numbers (1965–1971)	Not issued	Not issued	Not issued	USMC Enlisted (Mid World War II)	Not issued	USCG Enlisted (World War II)	Not issued
1,000,001 – 1,700,000	World War I enlisted personnel	Army Officers (1942–1954)	Enlisted Series 100 (Retroactive)	Not issued	Not issued	Not issued	USMC Enlisted (1943–1953)	Not issued	Not issued	Not issued
1,700,001 – 1,800,000	World War I enlisted personnel	Army Officers (1942–1954)	Enlisted Series 100 (Retroactive)	Not issued	Not issued	Not issued	USMC Female Enlisted	Not issued	Not issued	Not issued
1,800,001 – 2,000,000	World War I enlisted personnel	Army Officers (1942–1954)	Enlisted Series 100 (Retroactive)	Not issued	Not issued	Early Air Force Reserve	USMC Enlisted (1953–1965)	Not issued	Not issued	Not issued
2,000,001 – 2,800,000	World War I enlisted personnel	Army Officers (1942–1954)	Enlisted Series 200 (1920–1971)	Not issued	Not issued	Not issued	USMC Enlisted (1966–1972)	Not issued	USCG Enlisted (1948–1974)	Not issued
2,800,001 – 2,999,999	World War I enlisted personnel	Army Officers (1942–1954)	Enlisted Series 200 (1920–1971)	Not issued	Not issued	Not issued	Not issued	Not issued	USCG Enlisted (1948–1974)	Not issued
3,000,000 – 3,999,999	World War I enlisted personnel	Warrant officers (1957–1969)	Enlisted Series 300 (1920–1971)	Not issued	Not issued	Air Force officers (1948–1969)	Not issued	Not issued	World War II (Special Duty)	Not issued
4,000,000 – 4,999,999	World War I enlisted personnel	Army officers (1954–1957)	Enlisted Series 400 (1920–1971)	Not issued	Not issued	Not issued	Not issued	Not issued	Female enlisted (1942–1945)	Not issued
5,000,000 – 5,999,999	World War I enlisted personnel	Army officers (1957–1969)	Enlisted Series 500 (1920–1971)	Not issued	Not issued	Not issued	Not issued	Not issued	Special Duty enlisted (1942)	Not issued
6,000,000 – 6,999,999	Army enlisted (1919–1941)	Not issued	Enlisted Series 600 (1920–1971)	Not issued	Not issued	Not issued	Not issued	Not issued	World War II (Special Duty)	Not issued
7,000,000 – 7,100,000	Army enlisted (1919–1941)	Not issued	Enlisted Series 700 (1920–1971)	Not issued	Not issued	Not issued	Not issued	Not issued	USCG Enlisted (1943–1945)	Not issued
7,100,001 – 7,999,999	Not issued	Not issued	Enlisted Series 700 (1920–1971)	Not issued	Not issued	Not issued	Not issued	Not issued	USCG Enlisted (1943–1945)	Not issued
8,000,000 – 8,999,999	Female enlisted (1948–1969)	Not issued	Enlisted Series 800 (1920–1971)	Not issued	Female enlisted (1948–1969)	Not issued	Not issued	Not issued	Not issued	Not issued
9,000,000 – 9,999,999	Not issued	Not issued	Enlisted Series 900 (1920–1971)	Not issued	Not issued	Not issued	Not issued	Not issued	Not issued	Not issued
10,000,000 – 10,999,999	Regular Army (Enlisted Extra-US)	Not issued	Not issued	Not issued	Regular Air Force	Not issued	Not issued	Not issued	Not issued	Not issued
11,000,000 – 19,999,999	Regular Army	Not issued	Not issued	Not issued	Regular Air Force	Not issued	Not issued	Not issued	Not issued	Not issued
20,000,000 – 29,999,999	Army National Guard	Not issued	Not issued	Not issued	Air National Guard	Not issued	Not issued	Not issued	Not issued	Not issued
30,000,000 – 30,999,999	World War II draftees (Extra-US)	Not issued	Not issued	Not issued	WWII crossover #s	Not issued	Not issued	Not issued	Not issued	Not issued
31,000,000 – 39,999,999	World War II draftees	Not issued	Not issued	Not issued	WWII crossover #s	Not issued	Not issued	Not issued	Not issued	Not issued
40,000,000 – 49,999,999	Special duty enlisted	Not issued	Not issued	Not issued	WWII crossover #s	Not issued	Not issued	Not issued	Not issued	Not issued
50,000,000 – 59,999,999	Army draft force (P-WWII)	Not issued	Not issued	Not issued	Air Force draft force (1948–1966)	Not issued	Not issued	Not issued	Not issued	Not issued
60,000,000 – 69,999,999	Army draft force (Late 1960s)	Not issued	Not issued	Not issued	Air Force draft force (1966–1969)	Not issued	Not issued	Not issued	Not issued	Not issued
70,000,000 – 89,999,999	Not issued	Not issued	Not issued	Not issued	Not issued	Not issued	Not issued	Not issued	Not issued	Not issued
90,000,000 – 99,999,999	Philippine Army; Augments (WWII)	Not issued	Not issued		Not issued		Not issued	Not issued		Not issued

== Prefix and suffix codes ==
Service number prefix and suffix codes were one and two letter designators written before or after a service number; a service member could only have one code at any given time. The purpose of these codes was to provide additional information regarding a military service member with the very first prefix codes created by the Army in 1920 and greatly expanded over the next thirty years. The Navy created the first suffix code "W", written after the service numbers of female enlisted personnel, but it was the Air Force that made the greatest use of suffix codes until 1965 when the Air Force switched to using prefixes. Some prefix and suffix codes were also re-introduced, with different meanings, by various branches of military. In the modern age, the only code that survives is the suffix code "FR", written after the social security numbers of Regular Air Force personnel.

Service Number Code	Branch of Service	Prefix/Suffix	Meaning
A	Army & Air Force	Prefix & Suffix	As a prefix, used by members of the Women Army Corps. As a suffix, used by Regular Air Force officers until 1965.
AA	Air Force	Prefix	Used by personnel of the "Women in the Air Force" (WAF)
AD	Air Force	Prefix	Used by Air Force aviation cadets
AF	Air Force	Prefix	Used by male Air Force enlisted personnel
AO	Army & Air Force	Prefix	First used by the Army Air Corps to denote Regular Army officers who were qualified in aviation. Later used by the Army Air Forces (and eventually the Air Force Reserve) to denote reserve officers
AR	Air Force	Prefix	Used by Air Force dieticians
AW	Air Force	Prefix	Used by Air Force warrant officers
B	Navy	Prefix	Used between 1965 and 1971 as part of the "B-Series" enlisted service numbers
D	Navy	Prefix	Used between 1969 and 1971 as part of the "D-Series" enlisted service numbers
E	Air Force	Suffix	Used by male Air Force warrant officers until 1965
ER	Army	Prefix	Used by enlisted members of the Army Reserve
F	Army	Prefix	Used by field clerks during the First World War
FG	Air Force	Prefix	Used by officers and warrant officers of the Air National Guard
FR	Army & Air Force	Prefix & Suffix	Used briefly as an Army prefix by some enlisted members of the Army Reserve. Later used as an Air Force prefix for all officers and warrant officers of the Regular Air Force. After 1969, used as a suffix for Regular Air Force officers, written after the social security number.
FT	Air Force	Prefix	Used by Air Force officers and warrant officers who were without a component
FV	Air Force	Prefix	Used by Air Force Reserve officers and warrant officers
H	Air Force	Suffix	Used by female Air Force warrant officers until 1965
K	Army & Air Force	Prefix & Suffix	As a prefix, used by female specialist officers with service numbers of 100,001 and higher. As a suffix, used by Air Force Academy cadets until 1965
KF	Army	Prefix	Used female Regular Army officers
L	Army	Prefix	Used by enlisted members of the Women's Army Corps
MJ	Army	Prefix	Used by Occupational Therapist Officers
MM	Army	Prefix	Used by Physical Therapist Officers
MN	Army	Prefix	Used by male members of the Army Nurse Corps
MR	Army	Prefix	Used by Army enlisted dieticians
N	Army	Prefix	Used by female nurse officers
NG	Army	Prefix	Used by National Guard personnel
O	Army	Prefix	Originally used by Regular Army officers prior to World War II. In the 1960s, used by Army specialist officers.
OF	Army	Prefix	Used by male Regular Army officers
R	Army	Prefix	Originally used by Regular Army World War I enlisted personnel. In the 1960s, used by Army officer dieticians
RA	Army	Prefix	Used by Regular Army enlisted personnel
RM	Army	Prefix	Used by Regular Army enlisted personnel holding temporary commissions as warrant officers
RO	Army	Prefix	Used by Regular Army enlisted personnel holding temporary reserve officer commissions
RP	Army	Prefix	Used by retired Regular Army enlisted personnel upon recall to active duty
RV	Army	Prefix	Used by female warrant officers granted reserve commissioned officer billets
RW	Army	Prefix	Used by male warrant officers granted reserve commissioned officer billets
T	Army	Prefix	Used by flight officers appointed from an enlisted status
UR	Army	Prefix	Used by draft personnel who are later appointed officers in the Regular Army
US	Army	Prefix	Used by enlisted draft personnel of the Army of the United States
W	Army, Air Force, Navy, & Marine Corps	Prefix & Suffix	As a prefix, used by Regular Army Warrant Officers. Also used by female Regular Air Force officers and female Marine Corps enlisted personnel. As a suffix, used by Navy female enlisted personnel
WA	Army	Prefix	Used by enlisted members of the Women's Army Corps
WL	Army	Prefix	Used by female Regular Army personnel granted officer commissions in the Army Reserve
WM	Army	Prefix	Used by female Regular Army personnel granted warrant officer commissions in the Army Reserve
WR	Army	Prefix	Used by female enlisted reservists of the Women's Army Corps
