= Service number (United States Coast Guard) =

Identification number used for military personnel

United States Coast Guard service numbers were first created in the later half of 1921. In 2004 the Coast Guard began using Employee Identification Numbers, or EMPLIDs, to replace the Social Security Number on official forms.

== Coast Guard officer numbers ==
Coast Guard officer service numbers were unique amongst the military branches in that the entire range of officer numbers was declared upon the initial creation of the service numbers. The officer range extended from #1 to 100,000 and these numbers had yet to be exhausted by the discontinuation of Coast Guard service numbers in 1974.

Like the Navy and Marine Corps, the Coast Guard set aside the early service numbers for retroactive presentations; however, for various reasons, the Coast Guard never enacted this project and never issued retroactive officer service numbers. Thus, officer numbers 1 through 999 remained un-issued with the first Coast Guard officer service number being #1000 which was issued to Joseph F. Farley. The next range of Coast Guard officer numbers, 1001 through 20,000 were reserved for issuance to officers of the Regular Coast Guard. These numbers were typically issued to graduates of the United States Coast Guard Academy and other Regular Guard appointees. The Regular Coast Guard officer service number range had yet to be reached in 1974 when service numbers were discontinued.

Coast Guard officer numbers above 20,001 were reserved for members of the United States Coast Guard Reserve as well as Coast Guard warrant officers and other "non-regular" Coast Guardsmen. Officer numbers from 20,001 to 60,000 were used into the 1950s and, by February 1957, non-regular officer service numbers had reached #60,393. The 1960s and early 1970s saw the issuance of service numbers into the 70,000 and 80,000 range while 80 and 90 thousand service numbers had been used since 1948 for special uses such as cadets at the Coast Guard Academy.

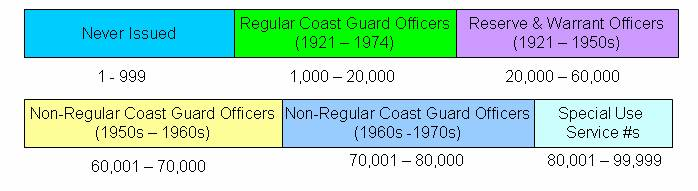
Final distribution of Coast Guard officer service numbers

== Coast Guard enlisted numbers ==
The first Coast Guard enlisted service numbers began at #100,000 with a range to 200,000. The purpose of beginning Coast Guard enlisted numbers in this range was to ensure that no enlisted Coast Guardsman would have a number previously assigned to an officer.

The first enlisted service number was assigned to Mason B. Herring. Service numbers were issued to enlisted personnel, based on date of entry, through the 1920s and early 1930s. In the mid-1930s, the Coast Guard also began a project to retroactively assign service numbers to former members of the Revenue Cutter Service and Lifesaving Service. These numbers eventually ranged from 149,237 through 200,000. It was also at this point that the Coast Guard began to write enlisted service numbers using the format "123-456" with an alternate method of replacing the dash with a significant space.

At the start of World War II, the Coast Guard expanded the enlisted service numbers into a new range from 200,001 to 250,000. These numbers were used between 1941 and 1945; however, in addition to these basic service numbers, the Coast Guard also activated several "special duty" service number series between one and eight million. These numbers were written in the format "1234-567" and were issued as follows:

- The one million series (1000 000 – 1999 999) was never issued
- The two million series (2000 000 – 2999 999) was not issued during World War, but the Coast Guard began using this series in 1948 and continued to issue these numbers until the discontinuation of service numbers in 1974.
- The three million series (3000 000 – 3999 999) was used for special duty enlisted personnel during World War II. The issued numbers of these series were between 3000 000 and 3081 999.
- The four million series (4000 000 – 4999 999) was used by female Coast Guard members between 1942 and 1945. Forty one thousand of these numbers were issued, ranging from 4000 000 to 4040 999.
- The five million series (5000 000 – 5999 999) was used for special duty enlisted personnel for one year in 1942. In all, issued numbers ranged from 5000 000 to 5801 499.
- The six million series (6000 000 – 6999 999) was also reserved for special duty personnel during World War II. Issued numbers ranged from 6000 000 to 6207 999.
- The seven million series (7000 000 – 7999 999) was used during the later half of World War II which the first numbers issued in the fall of 1943. In all, twenty eight thousand of these numbers were issued ranging from 7000 000 to 7027 999. The final number of the seven million service number series was the highest (but not the last) enlisted service number of the United States Coast Guard.

In addition to the special duty service numbers, regular enlisted service numbers continued to be issued during World War II in the 200,000 to 254,999 range. The Coast Guard also activated a 500,000 range and issued these numbers throughout World War II as well. With a theoretically limit of 999,999, these numbers had reached 708,000 by the end of World War II.

After the end of the Second World War, the Coast Guard began a new enlisted service number range from 255,000 to 349,999. These numbers were issued between 1945 and 1962 while also, beginning in 1948, the Coast Guard activated the two million service number series and issued these numbers from 1948 until the discontinuation of service numbers in 1974. The highest two million number authorized was 2199 999 although the highest number issued was most likely well below this number.

A final range of Coast Guard enlisted service numbers were between 350,000 and 499,999. These numbers were begun for issuance in 1962 and were issued until 1974. This number series was designed to "fit in" between the lower service numbers, which had been used prior to 1962, and the higher 500,000 numbers which had been used during World War II.

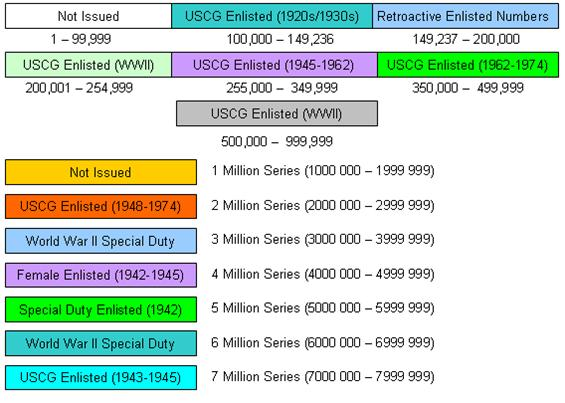
Final distribution of Coast Guard enlisted service numbers

Coast Guard enlisted service numbers were completely discontinued in 1974 with the Coast Guard being the last of the military service branches to convert to Social Security numbers as the primary identification means for military personnel. The Coast Guard was also the only branch of the military to never use any form of a service number prefix or suffix code.

== Employee identification number ==
In June 2004, the Coast Guard completed a program to have only an Employee Identification number (EMPLID) appear on Coast Guard Leave and Earnings Statements and other documents not requiring a Social Security number. The format for all EMPLID numbers is a seven digit number where the first digit is 1 and there are no alpha characters used. The numbers are issued without regard to officer or enlisted status and active and reserve components are in the same sequencing. The purpose of the program was to remove the Social Security number from records for identity theft reasons and to provide each service member with a unique identifier on Coast Guard Intranet programs.

== Notable service numbers ==
Significant Coast Guard service numbers include:

- 1000: Joseph F. Farley
- 6787: Robert E. Kramek
- 212-548: Alex Haley
- 2050-577: Beau Bridges

== See also ==
- Service number (United States Armed Forces)

== Sources ==
- National Personnel Records Center, Instruction Memo 1865.20E, "Service Number Information", 14 April 1988
- Military Personnel Records Center, "Training Guide Concerning Military Service Numbers", 28 June 2009
