= Service number (United States Marine Corps) =

Identification code for US Marine Corps personnel

United States Marine Corps service numbers were created in 1920, the same year as Navy service numbers, and were modeled after the same design.

== Marine Corps officer numbers ==
The first one hundred Marine Corps officer service numbers were intended for retroactive presentation to World War I veterans; the Marine Corps issued these early numbers alphabetically and the first Marine Corps officer number was issued to Major James Ackerman. Ackerman was issued the service number "01" with the policy established that all Marine Corps officer numbers would begin with a zero. The U.S. Army awarded their "01" to General John J. Pershing.

The Marine Corps officer corps in the 1920s was relatively small and, by the start of the 1930s, the Marine Corps had yet to issue more than one thousand officer service numbers. In 1931, the number of possible officer numbers was increased to two thousand with this number not yet reached upon the outbreak of World War II in 1941.

During World War II, the officer service number range was extended to 50,000 and, during Korea, extended again to 100,000; this number was not reached by the officer corps until 1966. At that time, the Marine Corps extended the officer service numbers a final time to 125,000. Officer service numbers were then discontinued in 1972.

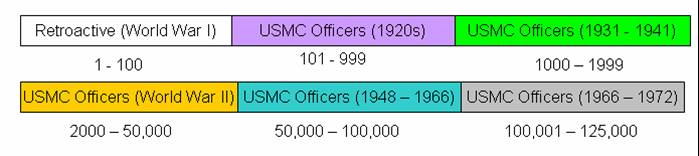
Final distribution of Marine Corps officer service numbers

== Marine Corps enlisted numbers ==
Marine Corps enlisted service numbers were also issued retroactively; however, numbers 1 through 20,000 were never assigned. Thus, the first Marine Corps enlisted service number was 20,001 and was assigned to a Marine named Alexander Schott. Service numbers upwards to 49,999 were also retroactive and assigned to discharged or retired Marines who had served between 1905 and 1917.

The enlisted service numbers between 50,000 and 60,000 were never assigned by the Marine Corps for reasons which are unclear. The next range of numbers, 60,001 to 99,999, were used for retroactive presentation from 1905 to 1919.

The first active Marines who were assigned service numbers fell into the range of 100,000 to 199,999 as it was these numbers which were assigned in the 1920s to the enlisted force of the Marine Corps. In 1935, with the service number cap of 200,000 almost reached, the Marine Corps extended enlisted numbers to a new cap of 350,000. It was in this range that service numbers were being issued upon the outbreak of World War II.

During the early part Second World War, the Marine Corps extended their enlisted service numbers to the number one million with numbers broken down into sub-sections reserved for particular groups enlisting during World War II. The first group, ranging numbers 350,000 to 670,899, were standard Marine Corps enlistees joining for wartime service. Numbers 670,900 to 699,999 were never issued and 700,000 to 799,999 were reserved for female enlisted personnel. The female enlisted service numbers were also the only numbers assigned a prefix code, as the letter W was used to denote female Marine Corps enlisted.

Until the middle of World War II, the remaining service number range of 800,000 to 999,999 was used by regular Marine enlistees. In 1943, the Marine Corps extended enlisted service numbers to 1,699,999 even though the original one million service number cap had not yet been reached. Marine enlisted service number 1,000,000 was issued in 1944 and the cap of 1,700,000 was reached nine years later.

Service numbers 1,700,000 to 1,799,999 were set aside for female enlisted personnel of the 1960s and 1970s while 1,800,000 to 2,000,000 was used by male enlistees. In 1965, with male service numbers running out due to a rise of enlistments during the Vietnam War, the Marine Corps extended enlisted service numbers a final time to 2,800,000. The highest Marine Corps service number reached was slightly above 2,699,000 before the numbers were discontinued in 1971. After this point, all Marine Corps service records converted to Social Security numbers as the primary identification means for service members.

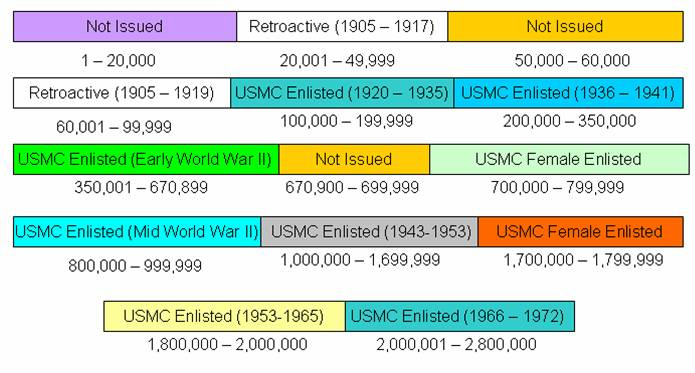
Final distribution of Marine Corps enlisted service numbers

== Notable service numbers ==
Significant Marine Corps service numbers include:

Officer

- 01: James Ackerman
- 032112: James Whitmore
- 096702: Wesley Fox
- 05254: Gregory Boyington
- 05477: James Roosevelt
- 03613: Evans F. Carlson
- 0257: Merritt A. Edson
- 06774: Joseph J. Foss
- 0332: Roy Stanley Geiger
- 04436: Samuel B. Griffith
- 0920: Oliver P. Smith
- 0863: Christian F. Schilt
- 01034: Littleton W. T. Waller, Jr.

Enlisted

- 20001: Alexander Schott
- 98912: Lou Diamond
- 275228: Michael Strank
- 287506: John Basilone
- 337948: Byron De La Beckwith
- 351391: Robert Leckie
- 385253: Brian Keith
- 439673: Lee Marvin
- 572744: George C. Scott
- 643310: Gene Hackman
- 1000000: Jack W. Hill
- 1060247: Lawrence Montaigne
- 1522597: Donald P. Bellisario
- 1956039: R. Lee Ermey
- 2080594: Leonard Lake
- 942989: Harry Kizirian
- 251055: Victor Maghakian
- 2119979: Richard A. Pittman

== See also ==
- Service number (United States Armed Forces)

== Sources ==
- National Personnel Records Center, Instruction Memo 1865.20E, "Service Number Information", 14 April 1988
- Military Personnel Records Center, "Training Guide Concerning Military Service Numbers", 28 June 2009
