= Jack W. Hill =

United States Marine

Jack Warner Hill
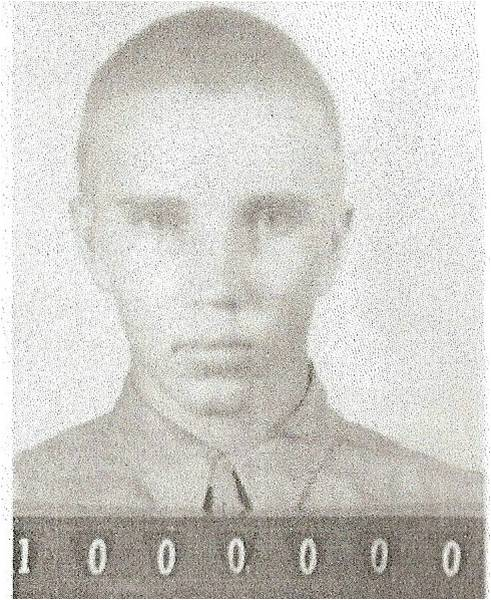
- Jack W. Hill, USMC, Service no. 1,000,000
- Born: July 2, 1928; Hamlin, Texas, U.S.
- Died: October 15, 1987 (aged 59) Carver County, Minnesota
- Allegiance: United States
- Branch: United States Marine Corps
- Service years: 1944; 1946–1950
- Rank: Corporal
- Conflicts: World War II; Korean War
- Awards: National Defense Service Medal; World War II Victory Medal

Jack Warner Hill (July 2, 1928 – October 15, 1987) was a member of the United States Marine Corps who bore the distinction of holding Marine Corps enlisted service number one million (1,000,000). Hill served a total of two enlistments in the Marine Corps, one during World War II, resulting in a discharge due to lying about his age upon enlistment (similar to Calvin Graham), and the other briefly before the outbreak of the Korean War. After his military service, Hill lived until 1987, when he was killed in an automobile accident.

== First induction and enlistment scandal ==
Hill was issued his number upon induction into the Marine Corps on July 8, 1944, at the height of World War II and during a time period when the United States Marine Corps was heavily engaged in several bloody battles in the Pacific Ocean. The issuance of the one millionth Marine Corps service number was a sensation in the media and was reported by several major newspapers, including The New York Times.

Hill's induction into the Marines later became something of a scandal as it was revealed that the induction board which had drafted him had done so without a check into his background, based on verbal statements only from Hill and his parents. It was then discovered that Hill had made false statements to the induction board and was only sixteen at the time he was drafted. The Marine Corps quietly discharged him in December 1944 after only five months of service.

== Second enlistment ==
Hill reenlisted on October 17, 1946, now truly at eighteen years of age, and served three and a half years of duty before being discharged a second time in June 1950. During his second enlistment, he held his previous service number of one million, although the post-World War II media took little interest.

Hill's final rank was that of corporal, and his only military decorations were the National Defense Service Medal (NDSM) and the World War II Victory Medal. Neither medal was presented to Hill during his service, but both were considered "automatic" due to the time periods in which he served: the World War II Victory Medal for service between 1941 and 1946 and the NDSM for service after June 27, 1950, during the era of the Korean War. In fact, Hill qualified for the National Defense Service Medal by only three days of service, as he was discharged on June 30, 1950.

== The One Millionth Marine ==
Although Hill is cited in Marine Corps history as holding service number one million, the honor of actually holding the one millionth service number technically falls to #1,020,001, since Marine enlisted service numbers start at #20,001: on this basis, actual holder of the one millionth Marine enlisted service number was Private First Class Edgar Patrick Wibbenmeyer, who was issued #1,020,001 on 11 August 1945.

== Sources ==
- United States Marine Corps History Division
