= Service number (United States Air Force) =

Military service number

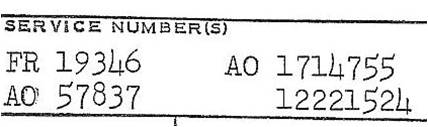
A collection of service numbers from a United States Air Force officer's service record. From left to right (top to bottom): A Regular Air Force officer number, an Army Air Forces Reserve officer number, a Regular Army (Air Corps) officer number, and a Regular Army enlisted number.

United States Air Force service numbers were created in the spring of 1948, approximately six months after the Air Force's creation as separate branch of the armed forces.

== Air Force officer service numbers ==
The first regulation of Air Force service numbers applied to numbers held by Air Force officers. In 1947, thousands of officers had automatically transferred from the Army Air Forces into the Air Force, with over a third of this number inactive members of the Officer Reserve Corps. The first Air Force officer service numbers ranged from 1 to 19,999 and were reserved for Regular Air Force officers who had "crossed over" to the United States Air Force.

The first USAF regular officer service number went to the most senior general officer on active duty when the transition to USAF service numbers began. 1A was Joseph T. McNarney. Other notable low numbers were: 2A George C. Kenney, 3A John K. Cannon, 4A Hoyt S. Vandenberg, 5A George E Stratemeyer, 10A Nathan Twining, 26A Curtis Lemay.

After the initial issuance of the first Air Force officer service numbers, the service numbers were increased with the second range extending from 20 000 to 99 999. These numbers were set aside for past, present, and future Regular Air Force officers with this range being used from 1948 until the discontinuation of Air Force service numbers in 1969.

For a brief time in the 1950s until 1965, cadets at the United States Air Force Academy were assigned a special range of service numbers only for use while attending the Academy. These numbers ranged from 1 to approximately 7000 based on admission date to the Academy. These numbers were followed by the suffix "K" and were not part of the regular Air Force service number system.

The service numbers 100 000 to 1 799 999 were never used by the Air Force office corps to avoid repeating numbers already assigned to Army officers; the only Air Force officers who ever held these numbers were those who had received their commissions under the authority of the Army Air Forces. The next range of Air Force officer service numbers began at 1 800 000 and extended to 1 999 999; these numbers were assigned to former reserve officers of the Army Air Forces who were now members of the Air Force Reserve. The two million number range was never issued by the Air Force, to avoid repeating service numbers of the Army, with the next range beginning at 3 000 000 and extending to 3 999 999. These numbers were intended for all officers considered "Other Than Regular Air Force" (OTRAF) and were issued in chronological order by date of commission after 1948. Such numbers were normally preceded with a zero.

In 1969, when the Air Force discontinued service numbers, the officer cap of 3 999 999 had not yet been reached. Thus, there were never any higher Air Force officer service numbers created. After 1969, the Air Force converted to Social Security numbers for service member identification.

== Air Force enlisted service numbers ==
Air Force enlisted service numbers were designed along Army lines with the first Air Force personnel issued Army numbers between September 1947 and early 1948. By the spring of 1948, the Air Force has established its permanent enlisted service number system with the design mirroring Army numbers almost exactly. It was also a fundamental principle that no airman would be issued a duplicate service number or a service number already held by someone in the Army.

The first Air Force service numbers were seen as "crossover" numbers from personnel who had been members of the Army Air Forces; the Air Force also used the Army's 8 000 000 to 8 999 999 service number series for female enlisted personnel. The nine million service numbers were never used by the Air Force with Regular Air Force enlisted personnel beginning with service numbers in the ten million range. This numbers extended from 10 000 000 to 10 999 999 and, like the Army, were used for Regular Air Force personnel who had enlisted from recruiting stations outside the United States.

The service number range of 11 000 000 to 19 000 000 was used by Regular Air Force in the same manner as the Army, in that these numbers were reserved for Regular Air Force personnel, who had enlisted from inside the United States, with the first two numbers a geographical code and the last six a personal identifier. The geographical codes for the Air Force were the same as the Army and recruiting stations had instructions to avoid repeat service numbers and to ensure that no service number was issued by both the Army and the Air Force.

The service numbers of 20 000 000 to 29 999 999 were used by the Air National Guard with the thirty and forty million service numbers never issued by the Air Force. Even so, many veteran Air Force personnel who had served in World War II carried these numbers over with them upon augmentation to the Air Force. Therefore, there were numerous cases of Air Force enlisted members holding 30 and 40 million service numbers.

The service numbers 50 000 000 to 59 999 999 were used by Air Force draftees between 1948 and 1966. These numbers were issued in the same manner as the Army using the same geographical codes for the first two numbers. As with other service numbers used by both the Army and the Air Force, procedures were in place to avoid repeat or duplicate numbers.

The last range of Air Force service numbers was the 60 million series extending from 60 000 000 to 69 999 999. These numbers were used from 1966 to 1969. Air Force enlisted service numbers were formally discontinued on July 1, 1969, and replaced with Social Security numbers.

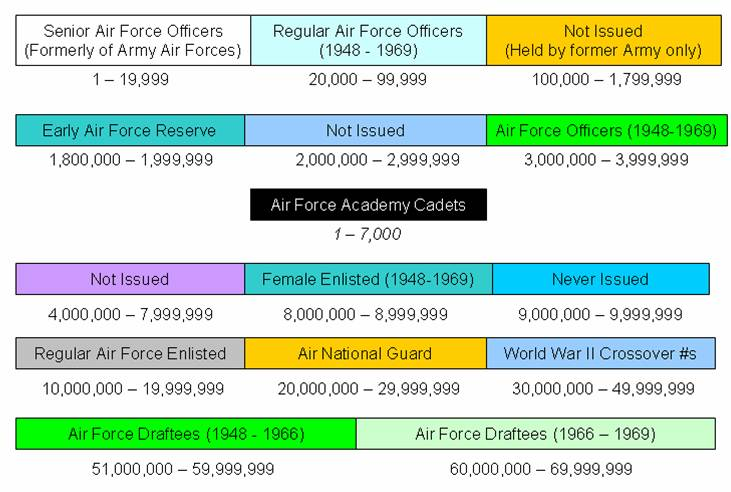
Final distribution of Air Force officer and enlisted service numbers

== Air Force prefix and suffix codes ==
Upon the creation of Air Force service numbers, the Air Force had no prefix codes for special situations but did create a series of suffix one letter codes to be used solely be officers. The original suffix letter codes were:

A: Used from 1948 to 1965 by male Regular Air Force officers

E: Used until 1965 by male Regular Air Force warrant officers

H: Used until 1965 by female Regular Air Force warrant officers

K: Used by cadets at the Air Force Academy

W: Used from 1948 to 1965 by female Regular Air Force officers

In the mid-1950s, the Air Force created several prefix codes intended to replace the suffix letters, although both prefixes and suffixes were still being used simultaneously in military service records. The 1950s prefix codes were as follows:

AA: Used by female personnel of the WAF

AD: Used by Aviation Cadets

AF: Used by male enlisted personnel

AO: Used by Air Force reserve officers

AR: Use by Air Force dieticians

AW: Used by Air Force warrant officers

In 1965, the Air Force standardized the prefix codes and created this final version.

FG: Used by officers, warrant officers and enlisted personnel of the Air National Guard

FR: Used by officers, warrant officers and enlisted personnel of the Regular Air Force

FT: Used by officers and warrant officers who had yet to be assigned an Air Force component

FV: Used by officers, warrant officers and enlisted personnel of the Air Force Reserve

Older prefix and suffix codes continued to survive until the formal disestablishment of Air Force service numbers in 1969. In addition, the prefix "FR" was frequently switched between a prefix and suffix. After the establishment of social security numbers as the primary means of personnel identification, many Regular Air Force personnel would annotate the prefix "FR" before their Social Security number; a practice which continues to this day.

== Geographical Codes and Service Number distribution ==
State Geographical Codes were used as the first two numbers of an Air Force enlisted service number to indicate where an airman had either enlisted from or had been drafted. For instance, the service number "12 345 678" would have a geographical code of 12 and a personal identification number of 345,678. The Air Force used geographical codes for Regular Air Force personnel and personnel who were issued service numbers in the 50 million range. The Air Force did not actively assign any 30 million draft numbers (these were held only by Air Force personnel who had "crossed over" from the Army Air Forces) and the sixty million range was issued without regards to geographical regions. In all, a comparison of the state codes is as follows:

State	Regular Air Force Codes	Air Force Draft Codes
Alabama	14	53
Alaska	19	50 2
Arizona	19	56
Arkansas	18	54
California	19	56
Colorado	17	55
Connecticut	11	51
Delaware	12	51
Florida	14	53
Georgia	14	56
Hawaii	10 1	50 0
Illinois	16	55
Idaho	19	56
Indiana	15	52
Iowa	17	55
Kansas	17	55
Kentucky	15	52
Louisiana	18	54
Maine	11	51
Maryland	13	52
Massachusetts	11	51
Michigan	16	55
Minnesota	17	55
Mississippi	14	53
Missouri	17	55
Montana	19	56
Nebraska	17	55
Nevada	19	56
New Hampshire	11	51
New Jersey	12	51
New Mexico	18	54
New York	12	51
North Carolina	14	53
North Dakota	17	55
Ohio	15	52
Oklahoma	18	54
Oregon	19	56
Pennsylvania	13	52
Rhode Island	11	51
South Carolina	14	53
South Dakota	17	55
Tennessee	14	53
Texas	18	54
Utah	19	56
Vermont	11	51
Virginia	13	52
Washington	19	56
West Virginia	15	52
Wisconsin	16	55
Wyoming	17	55

Within the Regular Air Force, the range of 11 000 000 to 19 999 999 was reserved for Regular Air Force personnel who had enlisted from within the United States; With the first two numbers a geographical code and the last six a personal identifier. This gave geographical recruiting areas 999,999 service numbers a piece to allocate to new recruits. Air Force regulations directed against repeating service numbers and allocated only a certain block of numbers for certain time periods of enlistments. Instructions were also in place that Air Force service members should not be assigned numbers already held by Regular Army soldiers. This resulted in the first 200,000 personal identifier numbers of each geographical code remaining un-issued, since these numbers had already been exhausted by assignments to Regular Army personnel. The breakdown of Regular Air Force service number assignments, from 1947 to the discontinuation of service numbers in 1969, was as follows:

Geographical Code	Allocated Numbers (1947–1948)	Allocated Numbers (1949–1960)	Allocated Numbers (1961–1969)
11	142 501 - 188 000	188 001 - 384 000	384 000 - 999 999
12	242 001 - 321 000	321 001 - 614 900	614 901 - 999 999
13	197 501 - 299 700	299 701 - 705 500	705 501 - 999 999
14	204 501 - 300 770	300 771 - 745 000	745 001 - 999 999
15	201 001 - 280 500	280 501 - 639 615	639 616 - 999 999
16	201 501 - 307 000	307 001 - 683 100	683 101 - 999 999
17	183 501 - 254 500	254 501 - 592 940	592 941 - 999 999
18	247 101 - 546 000	546 001 - 607 725	607 726 - 999 999
19	235 501 - 420 000	420 001 - 597 661	597 662 - 999 999

== Notable service numbers ==
Significant United States Air Force service numbers include:

- 4A: Hoyt Vandenberg
- 26A: Curtis Lemay
- FR1206: Benjamin O. Davis, Jr.
- AO3 017 981: Jack Swigert
- AF26 230 638: George W. Bush
- AF28 248 934: Anthony Zerbe
- AF28 282 310: Warren Beatty

== See also ==
- Service number (United States Armed Forces)

== Sources ==
- National Personnel Records Center, Instruction Memo 1865.20E, "Service Number Information", 14 April 1988
- Military Personnel Records Center, "Training Guide Concerning Military Service Numbers", 28 June 2009
