= Lou Diamond =

American marine (1890–1951)

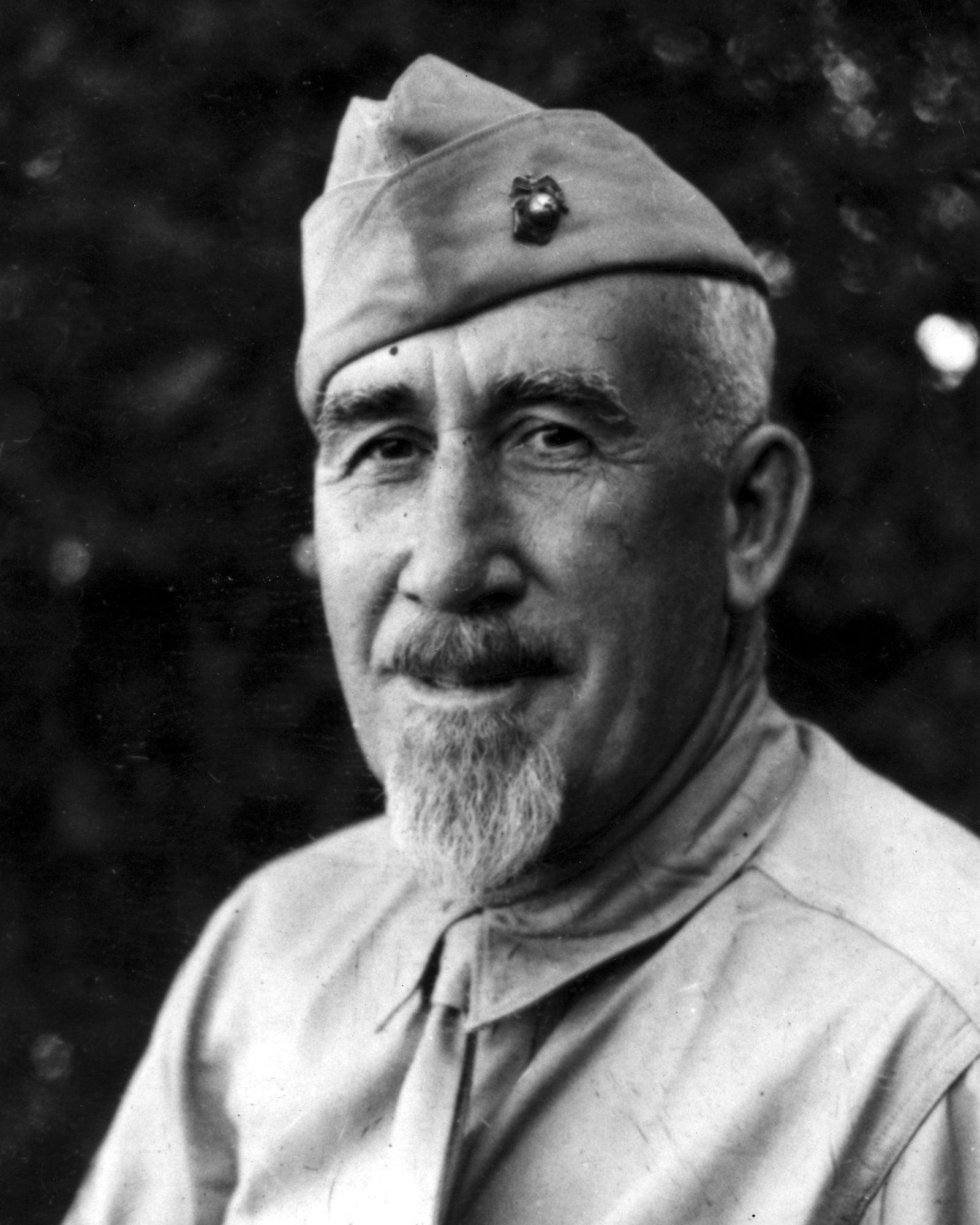
- Leland 'Lou' Diamond
- Born: May 30, 1890; Bedford, Ohio
- Died: September 20, 1951 (aged 61); Great Lakes, Illinois
- Military career
- Allegiance: United States
- Branch: United States Marine Corps
- Service years: 1917–1919; 1923–1945
- Rank: Master Gunnery Sergeant
- Nicknames: Mr. Marine; Mr. Leatherneck
- Units: 1st Marines Division
- Conflicts: World War I: Battle of Belleau Wood; World War II: Battle of Guadalcanal
- Awards: Navy Commendation Medal

Leland "Lou" Diamond (May 30, 1890 – September 20, 1951) was a notable member of the United States Marine Corps. He fought in France during World War I, served in China during the interwar period, and fought in the Guadalcanal campaign as a master gunnery sergeant during World War II in the 1st Marine Division, before retiring in 1945.

During World War II, Diamond was an expert in mortars and made significant contributions to battles on Guadalcanal, receiving a commendation from General Alexander Vandegrift. He was evacuated due to physical disabilities and later became an instructor in the U.S. He retired in 1945 and died in 1951.

== Early years ==
Diamond was born in Bedford, Ohio. His parents, Herbert Caleb Diamond (1864–1932) and Mima Ellenor (1866–1921), were Canadians from Belleville, Ontario. His father, of Jewish ancestry, was the youngest of the famed Diamond Brothers of the North-West Mounted Police (NWMP), who served in the Red Deer District of Alberta in the 1880s. He is descended from the Hudson River Valley Algonquin-Mohican Diamond family of the pre-American-Revolution era. His ancestors were United Empire Loyalists John Diamond (1759–1845) and Christiana Loyst (1765–1842), from Dutchess County, New York, who fled to Fredericksburgh, Ontario, after the Revolution.

Diamond worked as a railroad switchman before enlisting in the Marine Corps following the American entry into World War I.

== Military career ==
=== World War I ===
Diamond enlisted in the Marine Corps in Detroit, Michigan, on July 25, 1917. He was assigned Marine Service Number 98912. As a corporal in January 1918, Diamond shipped out from Philadelphia aboard the USS Von Steuben bound for Brest, France. Diamond served as a member 6th Marine Regiment in the battles at Chateau Thierry, Belleau Wood, the Aisne-Marne, St. Mihiel and the Meuse-Argonne. He was promoted to Sergeant and continued to serve as a member of the Army of Occupation. Diamond received an honorable discharge upon returning to the United States.

== Interwar period ==
Railroading, and civilian life in general, did not suit Diamond well, and on September 23, 1921, he re-enlisted in the Marine Corps.

Diamond itched for more action and he soon got it in Shanghai, with Company M, 3rd Battalion, 4th Marine Regiment. But the Sino-Japanese conflict, in Diamond's opinion, was "not much of a war," and on June 10, 1933, he returned to the United States, disembarking from the USS Henderson (AP-1) at Mare Island, California. By then he was a gunnery sergeant.

Diamond returned to Shanghai with his old unit, the 4th Marines, ten months later, and then was transferred to the 2nd Marines in December 1934. He returned to the U.S. in February 1937. Two years after his promotion to master gunnery sergeant on July 10, 1939, he was assigned to the Depot of Supplies at Philadelphia to help design a new infantry pack.

== World War II ==
Following the Japanese attack at Pearl Harbor, Diamond shipped out to Guadalcanal with Company H, 2nd Battalion, 5th Marines, 1st Marine Division, arriving at the beaches on August 7, 1942. He was then 52 years old.

Though not a "spit-and-polish" Marine, Diamond proved himself an expert with both 60- and 81-mm mortars, his accurate fire being credited as the turning point of many battles on Guadalcanal. Among the many fables concerning his Guadalcanal service is the tale that he lobbed a mortar shell down the smoke stack of an off-shore Japanese cruiser. It is considered a fact, however, that he drove the cruiser from the bay with his harassing "near-misses."

General Alexander Vandegrift, Commander of the 1st Marine Division, and later Commandant of the Marine Corps, wrote a letter of commendation that states in part:

The Commanding General takes the greatest pleasure in commending you for the outstanding performance of duty on Tulagi and Guadalcanal, British Solomon Islands, during the occupation of those Islands by the first Marine Division. As Master Gunnery Sergeant of Company "H", Second Battalion, Fifth Marines, you performed your duties in an outstanding manner throughout the above period. On several occasions, the well-directed and well-timed fire of the Mortar Platoon under your charge was a deciding factor in halting an enemy attack and enabling friendly troops to advance against enemy positions. You deserve the highest credit in connection with maintaining the morale of the men of the Second Battalion, Fifth Marines. You were at all times cheerful, energetic and encouraging, and never more so than during those periods when the going was toughest. You brought the benefit of your long service experience and mature judgment to the younger less-experienced men of your unit and helped them in every way possible. To every man in your company, you were a counselor, an arbiter of disputes, and an ideal Marine. Your matchless loyalty and love of the Marine Corps and all it stands for are known to hundreds of officers and men of this Division and will serve as an inspiration to them on all the battlefields on which this Division may on the future be engaged. The Commandant, U.S. Marine Corps has been furnished a copy of this letter, with a request that it be made a part of your official record.

After two months on Guadalcanal, physical disabilities dictated his evacuation by air against his wishes. He was moved to the New Hebrides and later to a hospital in New Zealand, where he somehow acquired orders to board a supply ship for New Caledonia. There a friend ordered him back to Guadalcanal – the supposed location of his old outfit. Upon his arrival, however, Diamond discovered that the 1st Marine Division had shipped out to Australia, a distance of over 1,500 miles (2,400 km). Diamond made the trip, without orders, by bumming rides on planes, ships and trains.

But Diamond was not destined to see any more combat. On July 1, 1943, he disembarked from the USS Hermitage (AP-54) at San Pedro, California, and twelve days later was made an instructor at the MCRD Parris Island, South Carolina. He was transferred to Camp Lejeune on June 15, 1945, and joined the 5th Training Battalion with the same duties.

== Retirement ==
Diamond retired on November 23, 1945, and returned to his home in Toledo, Ohio. Diamond was a member and frequent visitor to the Toledo, Ohio Jewish Serviceman's USO Club sponsored by the National Jewish Welfare Board (NJWB) in 1943, as indicated by his registration card coded as a NON-JEW with a hole punched in the top left hand corner. However, as noted by journalist Marc Parrott, who was present at Diamond's funeral, Diamond was a practicing Episcopalian.

== Death ==
His death at the Great Lakes, Illinois Naval Training Center Hospital on September 20, 1951, was followed by a funeral with full military honors at Sylvania, Ohio. Diamond was laid to rest at Toledo Memorial Park in Sylvania.

== Legacy ==
Actor Ward Bond portrayed Diamond in an episode of the television series Cavalcade of America entitled "The Marine Who Lived 200 Years." It aired on June 1, 1955; a copy has been located at the Marine Corps Museum.

The Filipino-American actor Lou Diamond Phillips was named after him by his father, a Marine Corps C-130 Crew Chief.

Although Diamond is sometimes referred to as "highly decorated", his only personal decoration was the Secretary of the Navy Commendation Ribbon, which later became the Navy Commendation Medal. Diamond's other awards include:

- the Presidential Unit Citation awarded to the First Marine Division for Guadalcanal.
- the Marine Corps Good Conduct Medal, eight awards, representing 24 years service.
- the World War I Victory Medal, with four campaign stars (Aisne-Marne, St. Mihiel, Meuse-Argonne, and Defensive Sector), for service with the 6th Marine Regiment.
- the Army of Occupation of Germany Medal, for service in the Rhineland in 1919.
- the Yangtze Service Medal, for service in China in 1927–32.
- the Marine Corps Expeditionary Medal, for service in China 1934–37.
- the American Defense Service Medal, for service 1939–1941.
- the American Campaign Medal, for service in the United States 1943–1945.
- the Asiatic–Pacific Campaign Medal, with two campaign stars (Guadalcanal-Tulagi Landings and Capture and Defense of Guadalcanal), for service with the 2nd Battalion 5th Marine Regiment.
- the World War II Victory Medal.

Diamond was also entitled to the French Fourragère (Croix de Guerre 1914–1918) as a personal award, since he had participated in earning it with the 6th Marines.

== Decorations ==

1st row	Navy Commendation Medal		Presidential Unit Citation	Marine Corps Good Conduct Medal
2nd row	Marine Corps Expeditionary Medal	Yangtze Service Medal	World War I Victory Medal with 5 battle clasps	Army of Occupation of Germany Medal
3rd row	American Defense Service Medal	American Campaign Medal	Asiatic–Pacific Campaign Medal	World War II Victory Medal

== See also ==
- List of historic United States Marines
