= Service number (United States Navy) =

United States Navy service numbers were created in 1920, one year after the close of the First World War. The creation of Navy service numbers coincided with those of the Marine Corps, as the Marines were under the authority of the Department of the Navy.

== Navy officer service numbers ==
Navy officer service numbers were simple in design since the Navy officer corps in 1920 was relatively small and there was little need for a complex service number system. The first Navy service numbers, which ranged from 1 to 500, were designated for retroactive presentation to retired naval officers who had served in the First World War and prior. There was much discussion within the Navy as to which Navy officer should receive Navy service #1, with suggestions ranging from George Dewey to John Paul Jones. In the end, the Navy never proceeded with the retroactive presentation of officer service numbers and the first five hundred numbers remained un-issued.

The service numbers 501 to 999 were reserved for officers who were then serving on active duty in 1920. The first thirty service numbers (501 – 531) were issued but never recorded. It is possible that these were retroactive but the Navy did not keep records of which officers held these numbers. The first service number of file was #532 which was issued to Samuel R. Colhoun who was a Captain in the Navy Supply Corps with service in both the Spanish–American War and the Civil War. The Navy continued to issue further service numbers to other officers based on seniority within the Navy.

In 1922, the Navy extended the service number range of officers to 10,000 and by 1925 had extended the range again to 100,000. The issuance of service numbers was based simply by date of commission within the Navy; by 1929, the Navy saw the need to extend this range again to 125,000. The cap of 125,000 had just barely been reached by the outbreak of World War II in 1941.

During the Second World War, Navy officer service numbers were extended to 350,000; these numbers were simply issued by entry date into the Navy officer corps without regard to membership in the Regular Navy or United States Navy Reserve. In 1945, with the service number cap now reached, the Navy extended officer service numbers again to 600,000.

It was not until 1955, after the Korean War had ended, that a need arose for continued expansion of Navy officer numbers. The new Navy officer numbers now extended to a cap of 800,000; service numbers had reached #670,900 by the year 1963. In 1971, with the service number cap of 800,000 nearly reached, the Navy extended officers numbers one final time to 999,999 which the Navy felt would cover all future officers to the end of the 20th century. Only a handful of numbers above 800,000 were ever issued and the Navy discontinued service numbers in January 1972.

== Navy enlisted service numbers ==
Navy enlisted service numbers were slightly more complicated than the officers' version, with enlisted service numbers being created in 1920 with a range of 1,000,000 to 9,999,999. Originally, there were no Navy enlisted numbers below one million to avoid enlisted personnel having the same service numbers as officers.

Navy enlisted numbers were divided into nine distinct "series" beginning with the one hundred series which was intended for retroactive presentations to those enlisted personnel who had served in World War I and the Spanish–American War. The one hundred series began at number 1,000,001 (written as 100 00 01) and extended to 1,999,999 (199 99 99); this granted the Navy nine hundred ninety nine thousand ninety hundred and ninety nine possible numbers for retroactive presentation. The Navy began issuing such numbers alphabetically through its discharged service records with number 100 00 01 (the first enlisted number) assigned to a sailor named Clayton Aab.

At the same time, the Navy stated that the remaining service number series would be issued to enlisted personnel based on the decade in which they served. Thus, the two hundred series (200 00 01 – 299 99 99) would be held by sailors serving in the 1920s, the three hundred series in the 1930s, and so on. In this way, the Navy felt that this service number system would cover all enlisted personnel to the end of the century.

The retroactive service numbers in the 100 series were issued until the early 1930s when the Navy abandoned the project with several discharged and retired sailors still without 100 series service numbers. The two and three hundred series were being issued as planned, however by the beginning of the 1930s, it was realized that the Navy would quickly run out of service numbers especially if there was ever a major war requiring a vast number of enlistments.

As a solution, the Navy changed the way it issued enlisted service numbers and now provided service numbers from all nine series. Instead of the first number indicating a decade, this number now specified a recruiting district code. By the start of World War II, the Navy was regularly issuing enlisted service numbers from the two through nine hundred series (200 00 01 - 999 99 99) with the first number indicating a recruiting code and the last six a personal identifier. This service number system remained unchanged after World War II and continued through the Korean War and into Vietnam. The Navy also stated that no service number should ever be issued twice; however, with poor communication between recruiting offices, there were ample examples of more than one sailor holding the same service number.

By the outbreak of the Vietnam War, the Navy realized that the enlisted service number system would require an overhaul as new numbers were running out and repeat issuances were becoming more and more common. As a result, the Navy created the "B" series with new enlisted numbers ranging from 10,001 to 99,999. The numbers would be annotated in the format "B12 34 56" with all six numbers a personal identifier. The intent of the Navy was to continue with higher letters of the alphabet upon the exhaustion of all available numbers. This would effectively grant the Navy over two million new service numbers.

The B service number series was issued from 1965 to 1971. In 1969, the Navy further activated a "D series" which reset service numbers to 10,001 to 99,999 (there was never a "C series" created). In 1972, Navy service numbers were discontinued upon the Navy formally abolishing the use of military service numbers in favor of Social Security numbers.

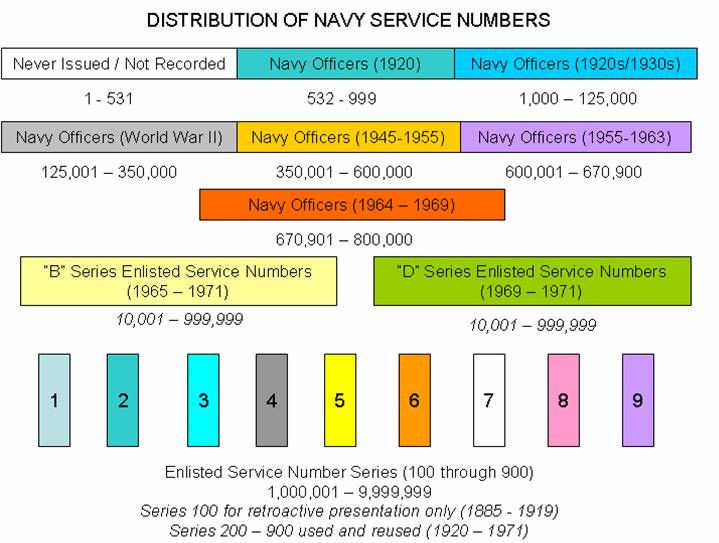
Final distribution of Navy service numbers

== Prefix and Suffix codes ==
Apart from the prefix codes B, and D which were the standard prefix codes for all B and D series service numbers, the Navy used the suffix W which was issued from 1948 until the late 1960s to female enlisted personnel. The "W" suffix was written behind the service number of any officer or enlisted Navy member who was a woman. This practice was discontinued in early 1970, shortly before the discontinuance of service numbers as a whole.

During World War II and into the 1960s, Naval Reservists would receive a classification code that was written after the service member's rate, rank, or service number. These codes would provide additional information about the Naval Reservist and, in this way, were the equivalent of a service number prefix. The Navy used a total of twelve "V-codes" for members of the Volunteer Reserve as well as two "O-codes" for members of the Organized Reserve. In all, these fourteen codes were as follows:

Naval Reserve Volunteer Code	Meaning
V-1	Naval Reserve Officer Training Corps member
V-2	Aviation branch
V-3	Communications branch
V-4	Intelligence branch
V-5	Naval Aviation Cadet
V-6	General Service & Specialists
V-7	Midshipman Officer Candidates
V-8	Aviation Pilot Training
V-9	WAVES Officer Candidates
V-10	WAVES Enlisted Personnel
V-11	Officer Candidates "O-Group" (Older candidates)
V-12	College Training Program
O-1	Organized Reserve (Seagoing)
O-2	Organized Reserve (Aviation)

== Notable service numbers ==
Significant Navy service numbers include:

- 1894: Harry E. Yarnell
- 2236: William V. Pratt
- 2442: Charles B. McVay, Jr.
- 3894: William S. Benson
- 5502: Chester W. Nimitz
- 7591: Marc Mitscher
- 7763: John W. Reeves, Jr.
- 8247: William H. P. Blandy
- 9643: Arthur W. Radford
- 16718: Ben Moreell
- 20485: Roscoe H. Hillenkoetter
- 69428: Max Leslie
- 77207: Chester Nimitz, Jr.
- 86243: Lyndon B. Johnson
- 106684: George Lincoln Rockwell
- 114685: Charles C. Taylor
- 116071: John F. Kennedy
- 141329: Gerald Ford
- 169340: Richard Nixon
- 173464: George H. W. Bush
- 204788: Robert Stack
- 265222: James Von Brunn
- 431144: Bob Barker
- 485019: Jimmy Carter
- 505129: Neil Armstrong
- 507205: Jim Lovell
- 543064: Kinnaird R. McKee
- 604112: Frank B. Kelso II
- 606076: David E. Jeremiah
- 104 52 73: Spencer Tracy
- 150 83 54: Paul Fix
- 288 08 15: Carl Brashear
- 356 12 35: Doris Miller
- 488 29 39: Bernie Kopell
- 555 88 96: Marty Robbins
- 566 72 38: Roy Jenson
- 705 45 26: Edmund Muskie
- 823 51 38: Nicholas Colasanto
- 960 39 80: Jeffrey Hunter

== See also ==
- Service number (United States Armed Forces)

== Sources ==
- National Personnel Records Center, Instruction Memo 1865.20E, "Service Number Information", 14 April 1988
- Military Personnel Records Center, "Training Guide Concerning Military Service Numbers", 28 June 2009
