= Arthur Crean =

United States Army soldier

Arthur Crean listed on a military pay record

Arthur B. Crean was a master sergeant in the United States Army during World War I. He was the first United States armed forces member to be issued a service number and thus holds service #1 in the United States Army.

When U.S. Army service numbers were discontinued in 1969, a report in the Des Moines Tribune noted that Master Sgt. Crean had been issued the number "ASN 1" on February 28, 1918.

== Biography ==
Crean enlisted the United States Army in 1899 and by the outbreak of the First World War was part of the enlisted cadre who formed the core of the National Army. In 1920, he became one of the most senior enlisted members of the peacetime Regular Army.

Crean's service record was destroyed in the 1973 National Archives Fire but a pay record survived, listing some of his service information. He is listed on it as a medical sergeant and the only confirmed military decoration he received was the World War I Victory Medal.

In June 1921, when John Pershing was listed as holding the first officer service number (O-1), Crean's service number was slightly modified. His new number became "R-1" to denote Regular Army #1.

== Sources ==
- National Personnel Records Center, Service number data and information sheet, published 1995
- Archival reconstruction record of Arthur Crean, Military Personnel Records Center
