= Joseph F. Farley =

American military man

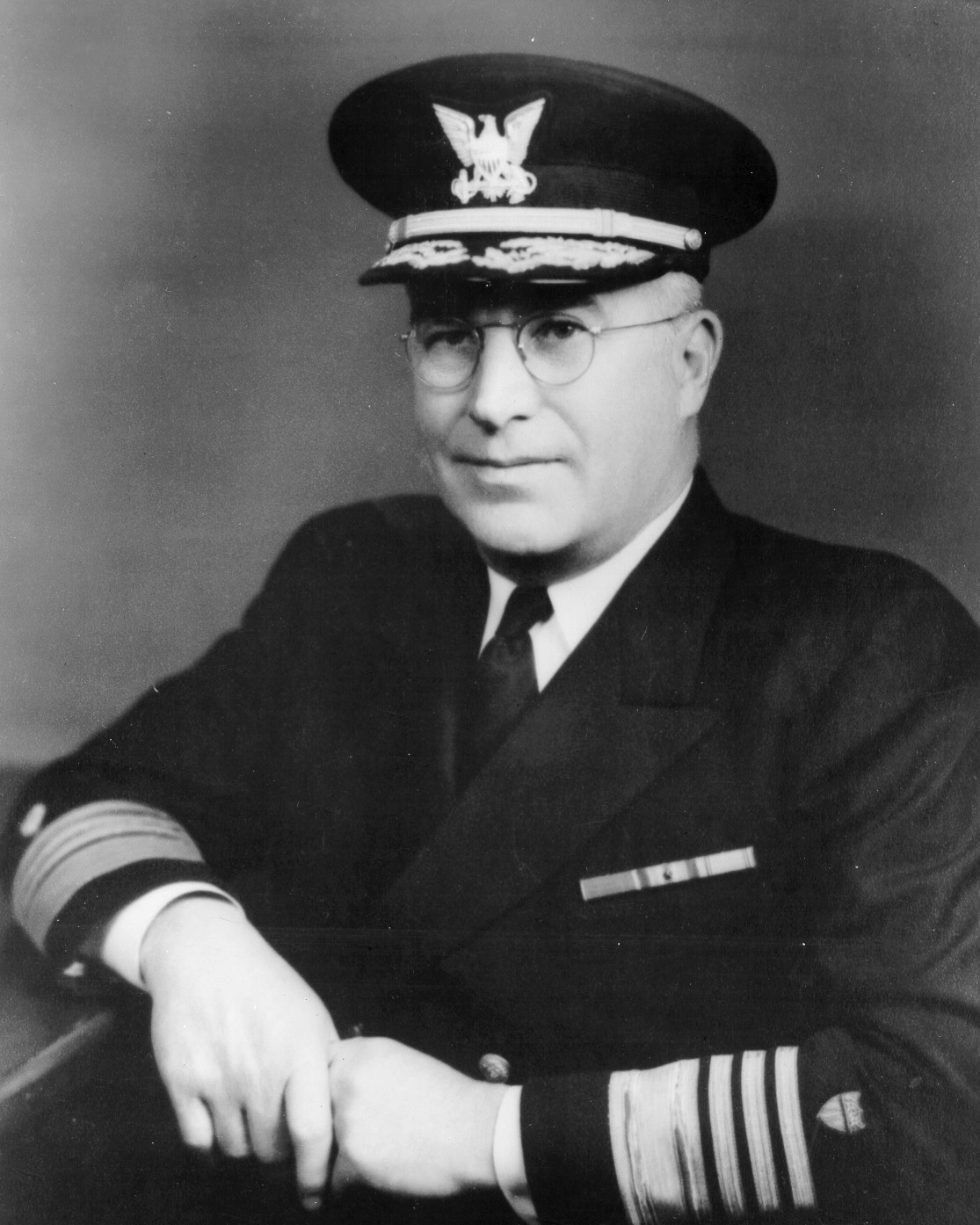
- Born: 22 June 1889; Oxford, Ohio, U.S.
- Died: 25 November 1974 (aged 85)
- Burial place: Arlington National Cemetery; Arlington County, Virginia, U.S.
- Military career
- Allegiance: United States
- Branch: U.S. Revenue Cutter Service (USRCS); U.S. Coast Guard (USCG)
- Service years: 1912–1915 (USRCS); 1915–1949 (USCG)
- Rank: Admiral
- Commands: Commandant of the Coast Guard

Joseph Francis Farley (22 June 1889 – 25 November 1974) served as the ninth Commandant of the United States Coast Guard from 1946 to 1949. He was also the first Coast Guard officer to be issued a service number and held #1000 on the Coast Guard officer rolls.

== Early life and education ==
Farley was born in Oxford, Ohio in 1889 and was the son of Joseph Francis and Sarah Foot Farley. After attending high schools in Trumansburg, New York and Ithaca, New York, he accepted an appointment to the Revenue Cutter Service School of Instruction on 10 May 1909. Farley's serious demeanor and habit of smoking a pipe as a cadet earned him the nickname of "Uncle Joe" at the school and he was known by that name for the rest of his career. He graduated and was commissioned as a third lieutenant on 10 June 1912.

== Career ==
Farley's initial assignment following graduation from the School of Instruction was aboard USRC Mohawk where he served until June 1913. His next assignment was USRC Seminole which patrolled the Caribbean enforcing neutrality laws prior to the United States involvement in World War I. (Note: During Farley's tour of duty aboard Seminole, the United States Revenue Cutter Service merged with the United States Life-Saving Service to form the United States Coast Guard. After 28 January 1915 all cutter names prefixed with USRC were changed to USCGC.) In July 1916 he was transferred to USCGC Onondaga for a short tour before reporting aboard USCGC Yamacraw in October.

With the declaration of war by Congress on 6 April 1917, the control of Coast Guard assets and personnel was transferred to the United States Navy but most cutters including Yamacraw remained manned by Coast Guardsmen. Farley was promoted 31 May 1917 to second lieutenant. Yamacraw sailed for Europe in August 1917 and assumed convoy escort duties in the Mediterranean Sea as well as between Gibraltar and Great Britain. After the end of World War I Yamacraw returned to normal patrol duties homeported out of Savannah, Georgia and Farley transferred in March 1919 to accounting officer responsibilities in New York City. He was assigned in January 1920 to the USCGC Scally and was transferred yet again in September, this time to USCGC Seneca where he stayed until December 1921. Farley was assigned a short tour aboard USCGC Gresham, leaving in June 1922 to serve on USCGC Morrill. Farley was promoted to lieutenant 12 January 1923 and assigned to USCGC Mojave homeported at Honolulu, Hawaii where he remained until February 1925.

Farley's next assignment took him to Coast Guard Headquarters where he was ordnance officer for three years. After being assigned to the Destroyer Force in March 1928 during the Rum Patrol era, he reported aboard USCGD McCall as commanding officer but was reassigned immediately the assume command of USCGD Wilkes. During his command of Wilkes, the ship attained the highest score during annual target practice in the Destroyer Force for 1928-29. Starting in September 1930 he was assigned additional duty as ordnance officer for the Destroyer Force and later assumed additional duties as athletic officer and service store officer for the Destroyer Force. During this tour of duty, Farley was promoted to commander. In January 1933, Farley was placed in command of USCGC Pontchartrain homeported at Norfolk, Virginia. In July 1934 he assumed command of USCGC Modoc stationed out of Wilmington, North Carolina. Modoc also served with the International Ice Patrol during part of each year where she and another cutter alternated on 15-day patrols off the Grand Banks, using Halifax, Nova Scotia, and Boston, Massachusetts as their patrol bases.

Farley returned to Coast Guard Headquarters in March 1937 and was assigned duties as chief communications officer. He made several trips to conferences and meetings during this period including one in Cairo, Egypt during February and March 1938, one at Montreux, Switzerland in March 1939 and another in Kraków, Poland in May 1939. He also served as a member of the coordinating committee of the Defense Communications Board. On 1 December 1941 Farley was promoted to the rank of captain. From June 1942 to December 1943 he served as District Coast Guard Officer of the Eighth Coast Guard District based at New Orleans, Louisiana. He was awarded the Legion of Merit for his service as District Officer and on 1 June 1943 he was promoted to commodore. Farley was reassigned to Coast Guard Headquarters in December 1943 as Assistant Chief Operations Officer until December 1944 when he assumed the assignment of Chief Personnel Officer. He was nominated by President Harry S. Truman and confirmed by the Senate to be Commandant of the Coast Guard succeeding Admiral Russell R. Waesche. Farley assumed the duties of the office 1 January 1946, the same day he was promoted to admiral.

=== Commandant ===
==== Staffing problems and demobilization ====
Because Farley had been assigned to Coast Guard Headquarters in a senior position in both operations and personnel, Admiral Waesche suggested him as a candidate to succeed him as Commandant. Farley's first nomination was rejected by President Harry S. Truman and Waesche concerned that the Coast Guard would be left without leadership, petitioned Secretary of the Treasury Fred Vinson and Comptroller General Lindsay Warren to speak to the President about the importance of Farley's nomination. Waesche realized that the Coast Guard would have many problems associated with personnel and missions in the post-war period. President Truman announced Farley's nomination 20 December 1945. After the war many of the top leadership retired because of age, leaving Farley to appoint an almost entirely new headquarters staff.

One of the first problems confronting Farley was that of personnel. Most of the officers and men who had joined the service during the war wished to leave as soon as possible after the war's end. Since much of the build-up of personnel numbers during the war were reservists, they were released from active duty quickly. This problem was helped somewhat by Waesche's plan to keep most permanent ranks one grade below the temporary wartime promotion ranks; this left the service with enough officers and petty officers but few men in the lower enlisted grades. Efforts to enlist new men into the lower ranks had to be made. With increased the responsibilities acquired during the war and a reduced number of personnel available, some missions had to be cut back severely or almost eliminated. Lifeboat stations were operated at bare minimum staffing levels, several cutters had to be put into the reserve fleet, and the Bering Sea Patrol was not operated in 1946 and 1947.

==== Marine Inspection and Navigation Bureau ====
The Bureau of Marine Inspection and Navigation had been put under temporary control of the Coast Guard during the war. Despite some maritime labor unions and Congressional opposition to the plan to permanently transfer the Bureau to Coast Guard control, Farley, with a terminally ill Waesche helping, successfully petitioned President Truman to approve permanent transfer of the bureau. Congress passed the required legislation effective 16 July 1946.

==== Budget problems and the Ebasco Study ====
By the time that the 1948 Federal budget was being reviewed by Congress, the public was calling for economy measures to be adopted. This led to Congress looking at the Coast Guard budget and questioning why the amount requested was five times more than the 1940 appropriation. They also noted that the Coast Guard had only three rear admirals before the war and now wished for eighteen to hold that rank and a proportional expansion in the numbers in the lower ranks. It was also pointed out by some members of Congress that the Coast Guard had assumed many responsibilities during the war without the statutory authority to do so. Congress ordered an investigation of the situation and the Coast Guard was required to cooperate. The report mandated by Congress was known as the "Ebasco Report" and was a study conducted by private contractor Ebasco Services, Inc. that began an investigation into Coast Guard operating practices in September 1947 and presented the finished report to Congress 21 January 1948. The report listed 193 recommendations for improving operations, some of which could be handled internally within the Coast Guard or the Treasury Department. Some of the recommendations required changes in laws that only Congress had the authority to modify. This resulted in Congress recognizing the need for the Coast Guard to have statutory authority for the many missions it had accumulated during the war years. The laws were enacted in a re-codified organic act in 1949

==== Cutters and Aircraft ====
With the end of the war, many of the oldest vessels that the Coast Guard operated were decommissioned in 1946 or 1947 and others were laid up in the reserve moorings the Coast Guard Yard at Curtis Bay, Maryland or at Kennydale, Washington. The Army and the Navy provided some newer replacement ships which were being decommissioned and they became patrol cutters and buoy tenders. In 1946 the International Ice Patrol was re-instituted after being suspended during the war years and additional cutters and aircraft had to be reserved for this mission. Congressional concerns about the Coast Guard's lack of interest in aviation led to sub-committee hearings on whether the Coast Guard should turn over the search and rescue mission aircraft assets to the Navy. Farley and Treasury Secretary Snyder pointed out that the Coast Guard was interested in aviation used for search and rescue but didn't have the funds to expand the service. The situation was not completely resolved until after Farley left office.

==== Expansion of LORAN and ocean station duties ====
As a result of increased air traffic after the war and heavier commercial shipping traffic the Ebasco Study recommended that the Coast Guard retain the responsibilities for LORAN stations and ocean stations that had been assumed during the war. The chains of LORAN stations maintained by the Coast Guard were modernized and utilized by both aircraft and ships for navigation purposes. The ocean station program provided up-to-date weather information and search and rescue for both aircraft and ships in the Atlantic and Pacific oceans. The initial attempt by the Coast Guard to operate enough stations to satisfy the demands of the airlines and shipping industry failed because of manpower limitations required in the Coast Guard budgets. The situation changed with the USCGC Bibb rescue of the Bermuda Sky Queen, in September 1947. The Queen was a flying boat that was caught in gale-force winds that caused her to increase fuel consumption and as a result she could not reach her destination. The captain of the aircraft turned around and flew to the Bibb and successfully landed near the cutter. After a rescue lasting for several hours, all aboard the Queen were rescued without injury and Bibb was received in Boston to a hero's welcome. This demonstrated to Congress that the ocean station program was valuable to the fledgling trans-oceanic airline industry and funds were added to the Coast Guard budget to acquire the cutters and manpower needed to operate the program. At Farley's request, the Navy loaned a total of eighteen moth-balled 311 ft (95 m) Casco–class seaplane tenders that would serve as ocean station cutters as well as two 339 ft (103 m) cargo ships for supply of LORAN stations. The Army supplied three FS-class cargo ships for the same purpose. Farley was instrumental in establishing and maintaining both post-war plans for LORAN and ocean stations. Development of helicopters as a rescue vehicle continued during Farley's term as Commandant with the establishment of the Rotary Wing Development Unit at Coast Guard Air Station Elizabeth City, North Carolina.

== Later life and death ==
After serving a total of 42 years in the Coast Guard, Admiral Farley was relieved by Vice Admiral Merlin O'Neill at change of command ceremonies on 31 December 1949. Farley retired officially on 1 January 1950. Farley died 25 November 1974 after a lengthy battle with esophageal cancer and is buried in Arlington National Cemetery.

== Legacy ==
Farley's term as the USCG's commandant saw the orderly demobilization from war, the assumption of new missions and responsibilities and the statutory definition of the Coast Guard's missions in both peacetime and during war. He was not completely successful in solving all of the service's personnel problems, but his leadership helped the Coast Guard to complete most of its manning requirements with the funds it had available.

== Dates of rank ==
Third lieutenant (USRCS)	Second lieutenant	Lieutenant	Lieutenant commander	Commander	Captain
O-1	O-2	O-3	O-4	O-5	O-6
10 June 1912	31 May 1917	12 January 1923	1 July 1926	27 June 1931	1 December 1941

Commodore	Rear admiral	Vice admiral	Admiral
O-7	O-8	O-9	O-10
1 June 1943	1 November 1943	never held	1 January 1946

== See also ==
- Rum Patrol

== Notes ==
Footnotes

Citations

Military offices
Preceded by Russell R. Waesche	Commandant of the Coast Guard; 1946—1949	Succeeded by Merlin O'Neill
