= Military Personnel Records Center =

Branch of the United States National Archives in Missouri

Coordinates: 38.7736°N 90.2307°W

The Military Personnel Records Center (NPRC-MPR) is a branch of the National Personnel Records Center and is the repository of over 56 million military personnel records and medical records pertaining to retired, discharged, and deceased veterans of the U.S. Armed Forces.

Its facility is located at 1 Archives Drive in Spanish Lake, a census-designated place in St. Louis County, Missouri, near St. Louis. Its former location was in Overland.

== Holdings ==
=== Archival records ===
The new Archival Records became open to unlimited access by the general public with all requests for information to such records responded by providing a copy of the entire file. Those seeking these records were required to pay a fee, whereas the "Non-Archival Records", that is, the bulk of MPRC's holdings, are provided free of charge. As part of the Archival Records program, a number of notable persons' records were also transferred to the custody of the National Archives and open to general public access.

== History ==
=== Establishment ===
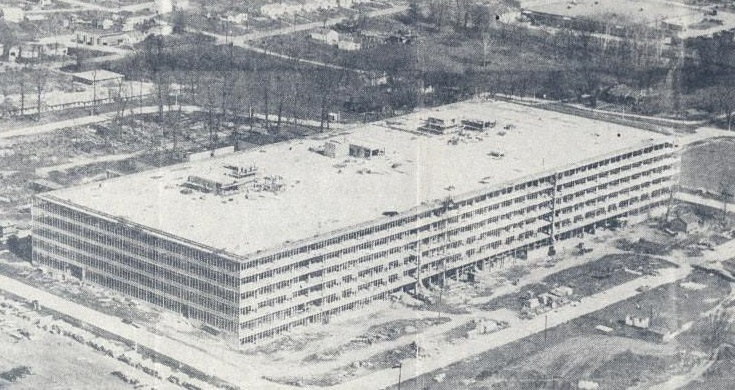
The opening of MPRC in 1955

The Military Personnel Records Center was designed by architect Minoru Yamasaki, and opened in the fall of 1955 after three years of construction. The building was originally known as the "Department of Defense Military Personnel Records Center" and was designated as a joint military command housing three separate records centers for the Army, Navy, and Air Force.

Air Force records were considered under the Department of the Army custody at the time of MPRC's opening and were stored at various facilities until July 1, 1956 when the Air Force took custody of its records and moved them to the Air Force Records Center in Kansas City, Missouri. In 1957, the records were then transferred to MPRC in St. Louis. United States Marine Corps records had previously been transferred to the center, under Navy auspices, in 1957. Coast Guard records began to be received in 1958.

On July 1, 1960, control of the Military Personnel Records Center was transferred to the General Services Administration. The three active-duty military records centers at MPRC—the Air Force Records Center, the Naval Records Management Center, and the Army Records Center—were consolidated into a single civil service-operated records center. GSA placed the center under the administration of its National Archives and Records Service (NARS). In 1966, the military personnel records center merged administratively (but not physically) with the St. Louis Federal Records Center (later known as the Civilian Personnel Records Center or CPR) and became part of the National Personnel Records Center. The building became then known as the "National Personnel Records Center, Military Personnel Records" (NPRC-MPR).

=== Later history ===
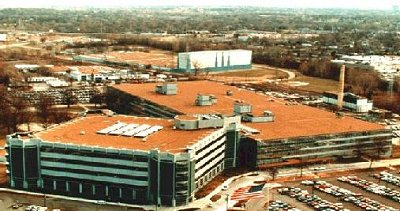
MPRC's former location in Overland, Missouri, with the Army HRC building attached. The white building in the background is the U.S. Army Publications Distribution Center.

In 1965, when photocopy machines became widespread at the Military Personnel Records Center, it became easier to reproduce service records upon request from all interested parties. Even so, between 1965 and 1973 the Military Personnel Records Center gradually became overwhelmed by records requests. and developed a bad reputation as being non-customer friendly, with an average wait time of between 11 and 16 weeks for record responses.

Until 1996, the Military Personnel Records Center operated through a complex system of paperwork forms with little computer automation. By the 1980s, serious complaints about the facility led the military service departments to develop procedures to hold their own records rather than have such records sent to the Military Personnel Records Center.

=== Move to Spanish Lake ===
In 2011, the Military Personnel Records Center moved to a new facility in Spanish Lake, Missouri. Beginning in 2015, the designation "Military Personnel Records Center" was dropped from most official correspondence, with the military records building in Spanish Lake thereafter referred to as the "National Personnel Records Center". Likewise, the civilian records counterpart was renamed from the Civilian Personnel Records Center to the "NPRC Annex". The term "National Personnel Records Center" may now refer to both the physical military records building in Spanish Lake, as well as an overall term for the National Archives federal records complexes located in St. Louis.

== Incidents ==
=== 1973 fire ===
July 1973 NPRC fire

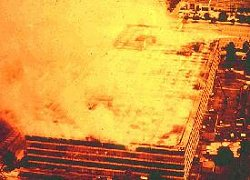
The fire in progress, July 1973. Between 16 and 18 million files were destroyed.

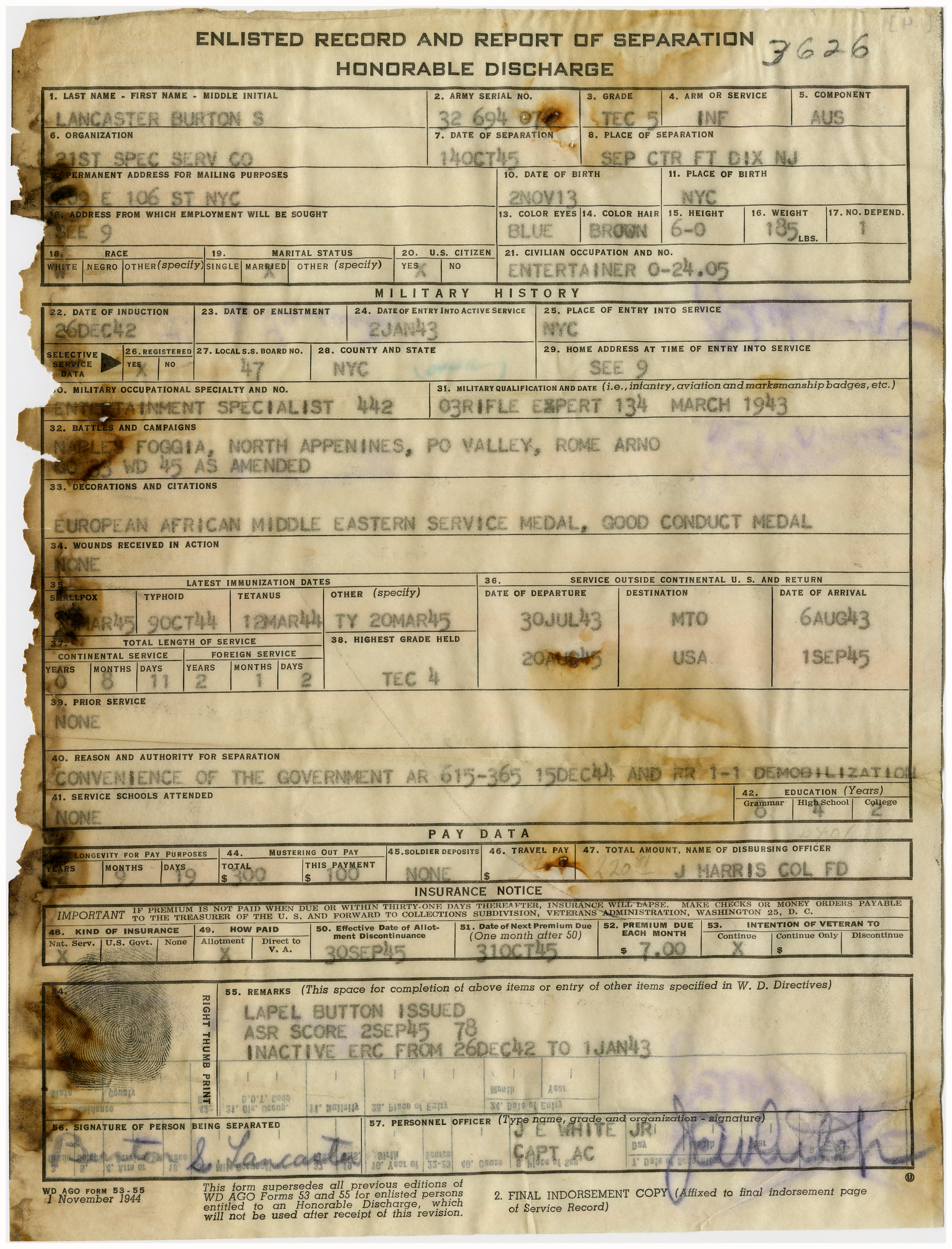
Burt Lancaster's burnt separation document

The National Personnel Records Center fire was a catastrophic fire at the records building in St. Louis that burned for more than four days in July 1973 and ultimately destroyed 16 to 18 million Official Military Personnel Files (OMPF). Specifically, it impacted records for Army personnel between 1912 and 1960, and Air Force personnel between 1947 and 1964. The fire was reported after midnight on July 12 and firefighters arrived just 4 minutes and 20 seconds after the first alarm sounded, but smoke and heat forced them to withdraw shortly after 3 AM. Water was extensively poured on the building exterior and through windows to fight the blaze, which raged out of control for 22 hours. The fire became so severe that local residents were forced to stay inside because of heavy smoke. On July 16, the local fire department finally declared the fire over after a total of 42 fire districts had cooperated to stop it.

Until late July, firefighters continued to spray water in order to stop periodic rekindling of the fire. Broken water lines also flooded the building, with the worst water damage on the 5th floor. Conditions arose for mold growth, and documents were sent to both McDonnell Douglas Corporation vacuum facilities in St. Louis and a NASA facility in Ohio for drying. After the fire, the NPRC began recovery and reconstruction efforts and established an entire new branch to deal with damaged records; staffers searched for alternate sources to supplement lost files, looking for information both within and outside of NPRC holdings. The National Archives has described the 1973 fire as an "unparalleled disaster" to "cultural heritage."

=== 2004 record scanning hoax ===
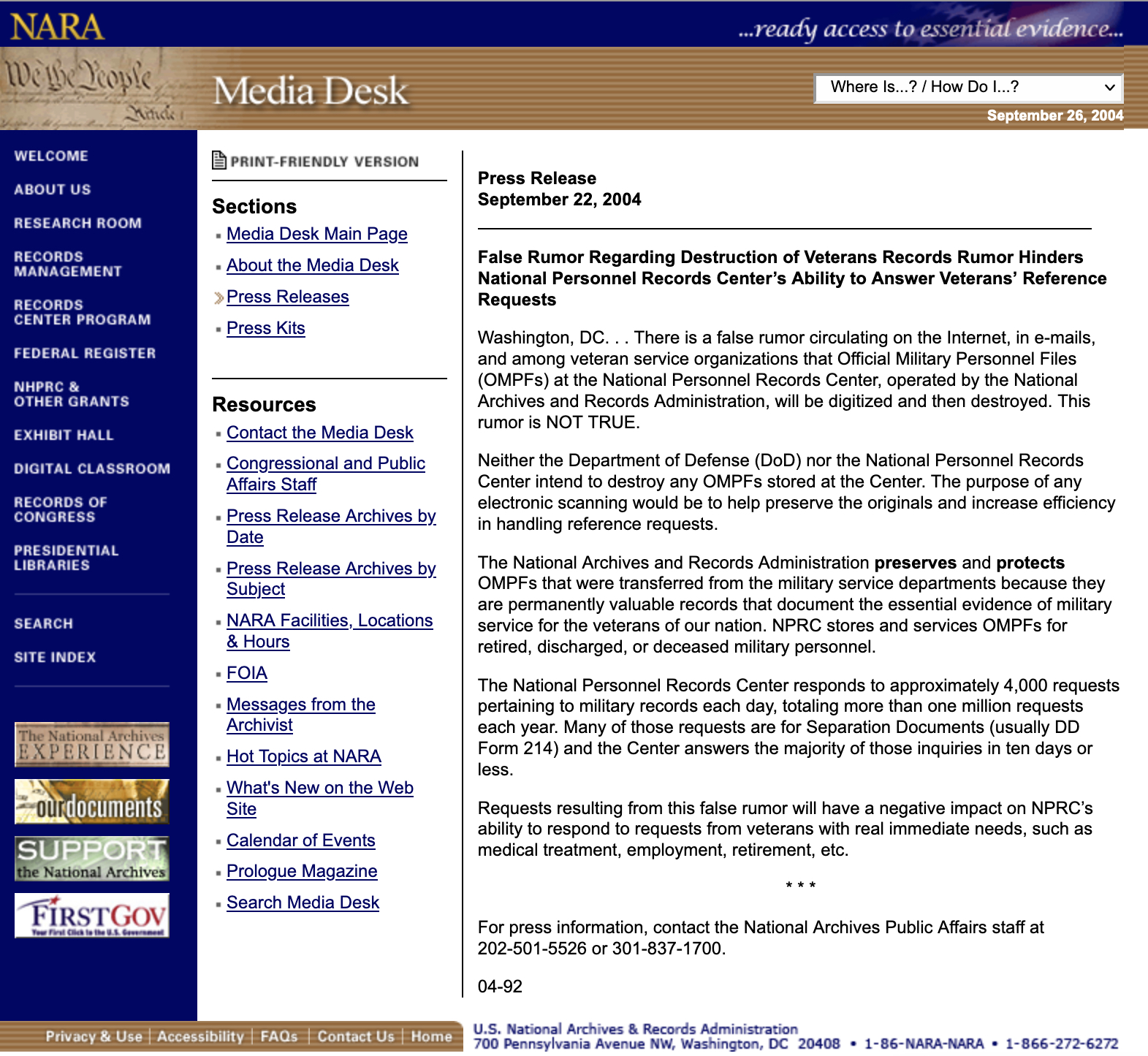
National Archives press release on the records hoax, as it appeared online in September 2004

In August 2004, an internet hoax claimed that the Military Personnel Records Center was electronically scanning "all military records on site" and would "destroy all hard copies" when the process was complete. The source of the hoax was a fraudulent email circulating online that advised veterans and dependents to request documents from the NPRC if they did not want them to be destroyed. The supposed "email" had a header reading: "Destruction of Original Military Records, HQ AFR/DP/04-254". According to Scott Levins, assistant director of military records at the NPRC, officials at the center first learned of the hoax in late August, and began analyzing record requests to see if request volume had increased. Director Peter S. Gaytan of the American Legion National Veterans Affairs and Rehabilitation (VA&R) Commission posted a bulletin, dated September 30, warning about the hoax and explaining that the NPRC would only perform scans to "minimize the handling of fragile documents or reduce the time it takes to locate a record." The Legion's VA&R division contacted the NPRC and "confirmed that the e-mail [was] a hoax." In September 2004, the NPRC had a backlog of roughly 120,000 record requests, and Levins stated concern that the hoax could cause a large influx of new requests. Gaytan warned in his bulletin that a surge in requests could delay document retrieval needed for burials, benefits, loans, and employment; the National Archives shared this concern. When the NPRC learned of the hoax, it informed the Department of Defense and modified its online application process to minimize excess requests. Also, to dispel the rumor, NPRC officials posted a notice on the eVetRecs (Note: https://vetrecs.archives.gov) website stating:

Neither the Department of Defense nor the NPRC intends to destroy any [Official Military Personnel Files] stored at the center. The purpose of any electronic scanning would be to reduce the handling of fragile records during the reference process or to reduce the time necessary to locate and answer an OMPF inquiry.

— NPRC official statement on eVetRecs website, 2004

Despite the NPRC warning, National Border Patrol Council (NBPC) officials were deceived by the hoax and posted part of the sham email on their website. It remained posted until the news website Federal Computer Week advised the council of the situation on September 21. Rich Pierce, executive vice president of the Border Patrol Council, said the email had come from what he described as "a really good source." The U.S. Coast Guard posted a notice about the hoax in the Military Personnel section of its website, warning of "false reports circulating around the internet to veterans' groups." (Note: Archive of the U.S. Coast Guard website on October 10, 2004, showing the notice about the personnel record destruction rumor) Federal Computer Week discussed the Coast Guard notice in a September 22 article on the hoax. The Coast Guard remarked that the "confusion may stem from a recent DOD paper" which stated that Official Military Personnel Files (OMPF) would be retained by the National Archives, and that the military services would have the right to destroy source documents. (Note: Archive of the U.S. Coast Guard website on October 10, 2004, showing the notice about the personnel record destruction rumor) The cautionary notice remained on the Coast Guard website until at least February 2005. (Note: February 15, 2005 archive of the site) The National Archives confirmed that neither the Department of Defense nor the NPRC planned to destroy any official files held at the NPRC. National Archives officials stressed that all records are permanently archived, meaning that they will never be destroyed and always maintained as historical documents. On September 22, 2004, the National Archives posted a press release on the rumor. The release read in part:

There is a false rumor circulating on the Internet, in e-mails, and among veteran service organizations that Official Military Personnel Files (OMPFs) at the National Personnel Records Center...will be digitized and then destroyed. This rumor is NOT TRUE...The National Archives and Records Administration preserves and protects OMPFs that were transferred from the military service departments because they are permanently valuable records that document the essential evidence of military service

— U.S. National Archives, Press Release, September 22, 2004

The U.S. Air Force website published an October 1, 2004 article about the hoax by military reporter Jim Garamone. Garamone said that, contrary to the "internet rumor," National Archives officials were not destroying any records. Also, he reported that according to NPRC officials in St. Louis there had been a "rise in the number of veterans requesting their records." John Constance, the National Archives and Records Administration director of congressional and public affairs, said: "We have a limited number of people to do the work and anything that ramps the requests up this quickly is a big production issue with us." Susan Cooper, the archive's public affairs officer, said that some records were being digitized "for reference and preservation" because frequent handling caused "some wear and tear." The Air Reserve Personnel Center also published Garamone's article in the November/December 2004 issue of its newsletter, and the U.S. Army and U.S. Marine Corps websites both continued to display notices about the file destruction "urban legend" as of 2023.

=== 2014 record destruction discovery ===
In 2014, two employees of the Military Personnel Records Center were discovered to have unlawfully disposed or destroyed over 1,800 documents by either abandoning them in lesser used areas of the MPR facility, removing the documents and then destroying them off site, or abandoning the records in a wooded area in western Illinois. 241 documents were found discarded in the Spanish Lake area in 2012. The two employees were later charged and convicted of destruction of government records; an investigation revealed that the majority of the documents had been administrative "interfile" material into military personnel records, most of which pertained to deceased veterans, and thus the breach to veteran privacy was considered minimal. U.S. archivist David S. Ferriero commended investigators who “helped to stop the actions of the individuals involved, and to protect these irreplaceable records.” According to the St. Louis Post-Dispatch, the legal plea of one of the employees involved said that the center "audited records handled by 41 employees in 2011-12 and found that of more than 1,200 records assigned to [the employee], 850 were missing."

After questions from Senator Claire McCaskill, the National Personnel Records Center conducted a further investigation and revealed that an additional ten employees had most likely been involved with the improper disposal of records, with enough evidence from an audit to recommend that five of the employees be dismissed from their posts. The motivation behind the mishandling and disposal of records was found to be a "bonus system" in which employees who had interfiled documents more quickly into service records were presented with a monetary paycheck award. The bonus system was discontinued, and an interfile audit program was initiated.
