= Torrecampo (surname) =

Family name

Origin
- Meaning: It is a single name formed by combining two words of Spanish origin: "torre," meaning "tower," and "campo," meaning "field."

Torrecampo is a surname frequently encountered among Filipinos, with roots that trace largely back to the Visayas region.

Notable people with the surname include:

- Rustico Torrecampo (born 1972), a retired Filipino professional boxer

== See also ==
- Filipino name
- Catálogo alfabético de apellidos, book of surnames distributed by decree to Filipinos
- Surnames by country § The Philippines
