= Filipino name =

Naming customs of the Philippines

Filipinos have various naming customs. They most commonly blend the older Spanish system and Anglo-American conventions, where there is a distinction between the "Christian name" and the "surname". The construct containing several middle names is common to all systems, but the multiple "first" names and only one middle and last name are a result of the blending of American and Spanish naming customs.

Today, Filipinos usually abide by the Spanish system of using both maternal and paternal surnames. However, the Filipinos have transposed the Spanish latter (maternal) name to the American English system of using the maternal surname as a "middle name", and adopting the American English system of using the paternal surname as the formal "last name". The particle y is used only for legal purposes and is otherwise dropped. The middle name in its natural sense would have been the second name if the person had one, but it is never counted as an individual's given name. Filipino Spanish, additionally, usually drops Spanish accents on names. American typewriters did not have an accent key, making the accent use archaic for print and documents.

== Historical context and examples ==
In ancient times, the Tagalogs had a naming system that changed via family dynamics. A Tagalog man (especially a chief) would lose his name, take his first-born's name, and become known as "child's father"; rather than his offspring adopting his surname like today. If he was baptized into Christianity, he would take a Spanish "Christian name" but retain his native name as surname. This naming system is retained among the culturally similar Tao people in Taiwan. For example, Calao's father became Don Luis Amanicalao (Lord Luis, a chief of Tondo, Calao's Father). This also applied to mothers (e.g., Inanicao) etc. One also gained numerous "poetic" titles (i.e., "pamagat"; lit. "to have something to go before", today literally translated as "title", from where the prenom "Gat" is derived) from his renown/actions (e.g. valiance in battle) or other naming means (like a naming feast for those without offspring).

Historical examples: Manila/Tagalog chiefs listed in the Tondo Conspiracy (1587–1588) Phelipe Amarlangagui/Amarlangagui ('Felipe, Ama ni Langawi'), Luis Amanicalao (Luis, Ama ni Calao), and Omaghicon/Amaghikon (Ama ni Hikon).

Another example is found in the only surviving baybayin writings; i.e., the Sto. Thomas Land Titles (1613–1625). In Document B (1625), Line 12, (Note: Copy originally translated by Villamor, 1922) a certain Amadaga was named. The contract stated that the owner of the land adjacent to the one sold in the contract was Maria Gada who had acquired it from Amadaga. Although no other context was given in the document, it is quite possible that Maria Gada is the daughter of "Ama ni Gada" (misspelled) and inherited the land from him as a legacy.

== Given names ==
Filipinos may have one or more official given names (as registered in their birth certificates and baptismal certificates) and various types of temporary or permanent nicknames. Filipinos commonly give themselves or each other nicknames and monikers. Some nicknames are carried for life, and others are used only with certain groups. A person can have multiple nicknames at different ages or among different groups of people.

=== Abbreviations, combinations, and elisions ===
Long given names can be shortened in various ways. Emmanuel can become Eman, Manuel, Manolo, Manny, or Manoy, and Consolación can be shortened to Connie, Cons, Sol, or Chona.

Filipino women with two given names such as María Cristina or María Victoria may choose to abbreviate the very common María (in honor of the Virgin Mary) as Ma. (with a period), thus rendering these given names as Ma. Cristina or Ma. Victoria. Filipino males with two given names such as José Mariano or José Gerardo could follow the same practice of abbreviating José as Jo., though this is not as consistent. Another common practice seen in other cultures (most commonly with Spanish conventions) is to elide or combine multiple given names into one nickname. The aforementioned María Cristina and María Victoria may thus acquire the nicknames Maricris and Marivic. Thus the Filipino names Maricel, Maritoni, Marijo, Maritess, and Maricon come from Maria Celia (or Celeste), María Antonieta (or Antonia), María Josefa (or Josefina), María Teresa, and María Concepción (or either Consuelo or Consolación), respectively.

A related custom is that parents combine their given names to create a name for their child. For example:

- Joseph + Maria = Jomari
- Alberto + Erica = Alberic
- Maria + Carlos = Malolos
- Elvin + Liza = Elliza
- Marino + Erlinda = Marinerl
- Jayden + Ana = Jayana

Some first names like Lodegrano or Lorimer may have been invented on the spot by the parents or be derived from some partially-remembered foreign term. Other coined first names have unusual spellings or spellings that are pronounced differently.

=== Honorifics and titles ===
Honorifics and titles are sometimes used in place of a person's actual name. As such, titles for family elders are often used by the younger persons and then adopted by the wider community: Apo (grandson/granddaughter). Lolo (grandfather) and Lola (grandmother) are used for senior elders; Tatay/Itay/Ama (father) or Tito/Tiyo/Tsong (uncle) and Nanay/Inay/Ina (mother) or Tita/Tiya/Tsang (aunt) for middle-aged elders; Manong or Kuya (elder brother) and Manang or Ate (elder sister) for anyone slightly older than the person speaking.

People in the Filipino community are often addressed by their military or police rank, professional titles or job descriptions, either with or without their names (e.g., Architect, Attorney, Engineer, Teacher etc.), instead of Mister, Miss, Ms., or Mrs., especially when the addressee's name is not yet known by the speaker. That applies to all people who are living and working in the Philippines. Sir and Madam/Ma'am are usually not used before a nickname.

=== Numerals and birth order patterns ===
People with the same name as their father are registered as Junior (abbreviated to Jr.) or numbered with Roman numerals (III, IV, V, etc.); their father adds Senior (Sr.) after his surname or suffix. Inevitably, the younger person tends to be nicknamed Junior, Jun or Junjun permanently. That can also be applied to numerals; i.e., the nickname can be Third or Fourth. Therefore, a family necessarily bestows a variety of unofficial nicknames to distinguish the various people with nearly identical official given names.

Many nicknames are bestowed by parents or other elders on children while they are still toddlers (e.g., Boy, Toto/Totoy (young boy), Girlie, Baby, etc.) and these nicknames are often carried by the person throughout their lives. These names may follow a certain pattern in certain cases, such as beginning with a certain letter of the alphabet (e.g., Diego Arnel, Diamond Amelia), such that all their initials will be the same (e.g. DAZL if the middle name is Zulueta and the surname is Lim). An example is former Senator Joker Arroyo's brother, Jack. Children can also be named after certain themes, such as countries, car trademarks, and popular brand names. For instance, World Champion boxer and incumbent Senator Manny Pacquiao named his two daughters Queen Elizabeth and Princess.

=== Reversals, indigenized names, and anglicization ===
The Filipino given name Dranreb was invented by reversing the spelling of the English name Bernard, and someone calling himself Nosrac bears the legal name Carson. Joseph Ejército Estrada, the 13th president of the Philippines, began as a movie actor and received his nickname Erap as an adult; it comes from Pare spelled backwards (from Spanish compadre, which means "fellow godparent").

An old custom is to replace or insert Filipino phonemes into a Spanish or English name: Edwin becomes Aweng, Eduardo becomes Dwarding, Roberto becomes Berting, Ponciano becomes either Popoy, Onse, or Syano, and Ricardo becomes Karding. Sometimes there is a tendency to convert a grandiose given name into something more mundane, such as when John Paul becomes JayPee, Peter John becomes Peejong, Anthony becomes Tonyo and María Elena becomes Ineng or Inyang. Complementary to this is the practise of anglicizing (with the implication of "modernizing") a Spanish given name. Thus, José Roberto becomes Joseph Robert (further shortened to Joebert) and Eduardo becomes Edward and then Eddy or Eddie Boy (sometimes further shortened to Daboy).

=== Monikers and progressional names ===
The variety of Filipino names, some of which have negative connotations in English, often takes English speakers by surprise. However, most Filipinos usually do not notice these negative connotations unless they are pointed out.

Many Filipino celebrities and high-status personalities, such as actors and politicians, are often more well known by their nicknames than their actual given names. One example is film and television celebrity German Moreno, who is more known by the nickname Kuya Germs (kuya = elder brother).

== Surnames ==
Map of the common surnames in the Philippines by province or independent city

=== Spanish ===
Almost all Filipinos had Spanish or Spanish-sounding surnames imposed on them for taxation purposes, but a number of them have indigenous Filipino surnames. On November 21, 1849, Governor General Narciso Clavería y Zaldúa issued a decree stating that Filipinos should adopt Spanish surnames to make census counting easier. Some Filipinos retained their native pre-colonial names, especially those who were exempted from the Clavería decree such as the descendants of rulers of the Maginoo or noble class.

The Spanish surname category provides the most common surnames in the Philippines. At the course of time, some Spanish surnames were altered (with some eventually diverged/displaced their original spelling), as resulted from illiteracy among the poor and farming class bearing such surnames, creating confusion in the civil registry and a sense of detachment from their better-off relatives. Except for the "ñ", Filipino surnames from Spanish are written without accents due to US-imported typewriters used in civil registry that lack special characters.

=== Indigenous languages ===
Though most Filipinos adopted Spanish surnames, some adopted surnames that derive from words in indigenous Philippine languages. Like with Spanish surnames, most of these names were introduced through the Catálogo alfabético de apellidos, since the majority of Filipino commoners only had one given name prior to Claveria's decree.

A significant number of people were exempt from the decree, since they already had preexisting surnames adopted prior to the Catálogo. Most of these preexisting indigenous surnames were originally names or titles of local native rulers (datu), nobility (maginoo), and other renowned personages. They were preserved as surnames by their descendants as the ruling classes were baptized and transitioned into the aristocratic Principalia class during the Spanish colonial era. Examples of surnames from native nobility include Lacandola, Macapagal, Macabulos, and Tupas, among others. Many of these surnames also incorporate the original title and names of the rulers, like Lacandola (which retains Lakan, "paramount ruler"), Dayanghirang (which retains Dayang, "noble lady"), or Gatpandan (which retains Gat, "lord"). They were allowed to keep the name to claim tax exemptions.

The majority of indigenous surnames, whether preexisting or adopted from the Catálogo, derive from words describing qualities of people (e.g. Panganiban, "strength"; Dimayuga, "defiant"; Dalisay, "pure"; Bantugan, "famed"; Manalastas, "knowledgeable"; Malicsi, "agile"), place of origin (e.g. Magbanua, "town dweller"; Bondoc, "mountain [dweller]"; Bacolod, "hill [dweller]", etc.), occupation or rank (e.g. Mandigma, "warrior"; Halili, "successor" or "heir"; Puno, "leader", etc.), objects or natural phenomena (e.g. Bituin or Bituon, "star"; Bulalayao, "rainbow"; Tanglao, "torch"; Batongbakal, "iron ore"; Banaag, "radiance of the rising sun"; Olan, "rain", etc.), or animals and plants (e.g. Kalaw, "hornbill"; Calapati, "pigeon"; Camantigue, "garden balsam"; Abucay, "Philippine cockatoo", etc.).

Most indigenous surnames are spelled closely following the Spanish-derived orthographic conventions of the time. Many of these words are spelled differently today in the various Philippine languages (following spelling reforms since the late 19th century).

=== Cordilleran ===
Unlike their lowlander counterparts, Igorots living in the Cordillera Central in northern Luzon were not conquered by the Spaniards and preserved their naming customs from foreign influence. Each group had their own naming customs, but generally, like Indonesian names, there is only one given name and no surname to speak of. The given name's meaning is usually connected to natural phenomena or objects, such as danum for water. Only the Igorots who had interacted with Spaniards and lowlanders for trade were given a name that follows the binomial "first name"-"surname" system, such as Mateo Cariño and Mateo Carantes.

At the beginning of the 20th century and the advent of the American occupation of the Philippines, the Igorots' naming customs slowly conformed with the national legal naming system used today, aided by the evangelization efforts of American Protestant missionaries. Most older people, however, still keep the singular given name given to them by their parents while also using the "Christian names" to conform to Philippine law. The singular given names of some individuals living in the early 20th century have since been adopted as a surname by their descendants.

=== Chinese ===
Chinese Filipinos whose ancestors came to the Philippines from 1898 onward usually have single syllable Chinese surnames. On the other hand, most Chinese Filipinos with ancestors that came to the Philippines prior to 1898 usually have multisyllabic Chinese surnames such as Gokongwei, Ongpin, Pempengco, Yuchengco, Teehankee, and Yaptinchay among such others. They were originally full Chinese names that were transliterated into Spanish orthography and adopted as surnames.

Common single-syllable Chinese Filipino surnames are Tan (陳), Lim (林), Chua (蔡), Uy (黃) and Ong (王). Most such surnames are spelled according to their Hokkien pronunciation.

There are also multiple syllable Chinese surnames that are Spanish transliterations of Hokkien words. Surnames like Tuazon (大孫, eldest grandson), Dizon (二孫, second grandson), Samson/Sanson (三孫, grandson), Sison (四孫, fourth grandson), Gozun/Gozum/Gozon/Goson (五孫, fifth grandson), Lacson (六孫, sixth grandson), Tecson/Ticzon/Tiongson/Teoxon (德孫/提克宗/頂客/东阳顺, seventh grandson), Sioson (西奥森, eight grandson) and Hizon (希森, ninth grandson) are examples of transliterations of designations that use the Hokkien suffix -son (孫) used as surnames for some Chinese Filipinos who trace their ancestry from Chinese immigrants to the Philippines during the Spanish colonial era. The surname Son/Sun (孫) is listed in the Classical Chinese text Hundred Family Surnames, perhaps shedding light on the Hokkien suffix -son used here as a surname alongside some sort of accompanying enumeration scheme.

=== Moros ===
Moros (Muslim Filipinos) usually bear surnames of Arabic origin, usually Muslim given names that were used as patronymics. Other sources of Moro surnames are clan names, especially among the Maranao and Maguindanao peoples.

== See also ==
- Catálogo alfabético de apellidos, book of surnames distributed by decree to Filipinos
- Filipino middle names
- Filipino naming tradition
- Philippine kinship
- Surnames by country § Philippines
