= Rozzano (given name) =

Rozzano is a given name. Notable people with the given name include:

- Rozzano Rufino Biazon (born 1969), Filipino politician
- Rozzano D. Briguez (born 1964), Filipino general
- Rozzano Locsin (born 1954), Filipino–American professor

== See also ==
- Rozzano, a comune in Lombardy, Italy
