= Federal Archives =

Federal Archives may refer to:

- German Federal Archives
- Swiss Federal Archives
- Leo J. Ryan Memorial Federal Archives and Records Center in the United States

== See also ==
- List of national archives
