= Locsin =

Locsín is the surname of a prominent Hiligaynon family whose patriarch, Wo Sin Lok, a Fujianese from Amoy, settled in Molo, Iloilo City in 1700s. He hispanized his name to Agustín Locsín and was baptized a Christian in the Catholic Church. Notable people with the surname include:

- Angel Locsin (born 1985), Filipino actress
- José Locsín (1891–1977), Filipino politician
- Leandro Locsin (1928–94), Filipino architect
- Leandro Locsin Fullon (1874–1904), Filipino general and government administrator
- Noli Locsin (born 1971), Filipino basketball player
- Rozzano Locsin (born 1954), Filipino professor at the University of Tokushima
- Teodoro Locsin Sr. (1914–2000), Filipino journalist and poet
- Teodoro Locsin Jr. (born 1948), Filipino politician and diplomat

== See also ==
- Hispanized Filipino-Chinese surnames
