= Korean War Service Medal =

South Korean military award

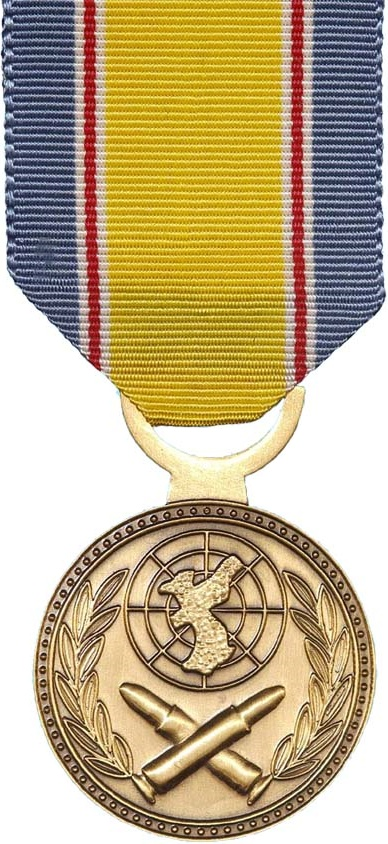
- Korean War Service Medal, obverse
- Type: Service medal
- Presented by: the South Korean Minister of National Defense
- Eligibility: All United Nations military forces that served during the Korean War
- Status: Currently awarded
- Service ribbon
- Related: Korean Service Medal; Korean Defense Service Medal (US); Korea Medal (UK and Commonwealth); United Nations Korea Medal

The Korean War Service Medal (KWSM, Korean: 6.25사변종군기장, lit. '"June 25th Incident Participation Medal"'), also known as the Republic of Korea War Service Medal (ROKWSM), is a military award of South Korea which was first authorized in December 1950.

== History ==
=== 6.25 Incident Participation Medal ===
Originally and technically known as the 6.25 Incident Participation Medal (Presidential decree #390; 6.25 stands for June 25, 1950, the date of the beginning of the North Korean invasion into South Korea.), the colored and enameled 5-pointed star version of the Korean War Service Medal was first authorized to South Korean troops who had participated in the initial counter-assaults against North Korean aggression in June 1950.

On September 15, 1951, President Syngman Rhee referred to and authorized the commander-chief of the United Nations Command to confer the award of the "Korean War Medal" and "Korean War Ribbon" ("Korean War Service Medal"), "to the brave and valiant members of the United Nations Command who have been, and are now, combating the communist aggressor in Korea."

==== Crossed bullets medal ====
On April 14, 1954, the South Korean government authorized the change of the star medal design to the round "Crossed Bullets" design (Presidential decree #892) of the Korean War Service Medal. The Taeguk symbol is not worn on the center of the suspension ribbon of the original medal or the suspension ribbon of the crossed bullets medal. The Taeguk symbol is only on the center of the service ribbon.

== Criteria ==
The South Korean government specifies the eligibility period and criteria. Only the South Korean-provided medal is approved by the US government to meet the US criteria for wear on military uniforms.

In order to wear the medal and ribbon personnel must have:

- served between the outbreak of hostilities, June 25, 1950, and the date the armistice was signed, July 27, 1953:
- been on permanent assignment or on temporary duty for 30 consecutive days or 60 non-consecutive days, and
- performed their duty within the territorial limits of Korea, in the waters immediately adjacent thereto or in aerial flight over Korea participating in actual combat operations or in support of combat operations.

=== Order of precedence ===
The order of precedence for non-US service medals and ribbons is determined by date of approval. The Republic of Korea War Service Medal (August 20, 1999) should be worn after the Kuwait Liberation Medal (March 16, 1995). For the majority of Korean War veterans, the medal will be worn after the United Nations Service Medal, or the Republic of Vietnam Campaign Medal if they served during that conflict.

== Foreign acceptance ==
=== Australia ===
On April 6, 2017, the Korean War Service Medal was authorized for acceptance and approved for wear, by the Governor-General of Australia. This approval came after the efforts of the Australian Council of Korea Veterans Associations to get the South Korean government to extend a new offer for the government of Australia to accept. Veterans who meet the eligibility criteria may obtain the medals from private medal dealers.

=== New Zealand ===
On April 23, 2001, the Korean War Service Medal was authorized for distribution and wear by service members of the British Commonwealth forces including the New Zealand Defence Force (NZDF).

=== United States ===
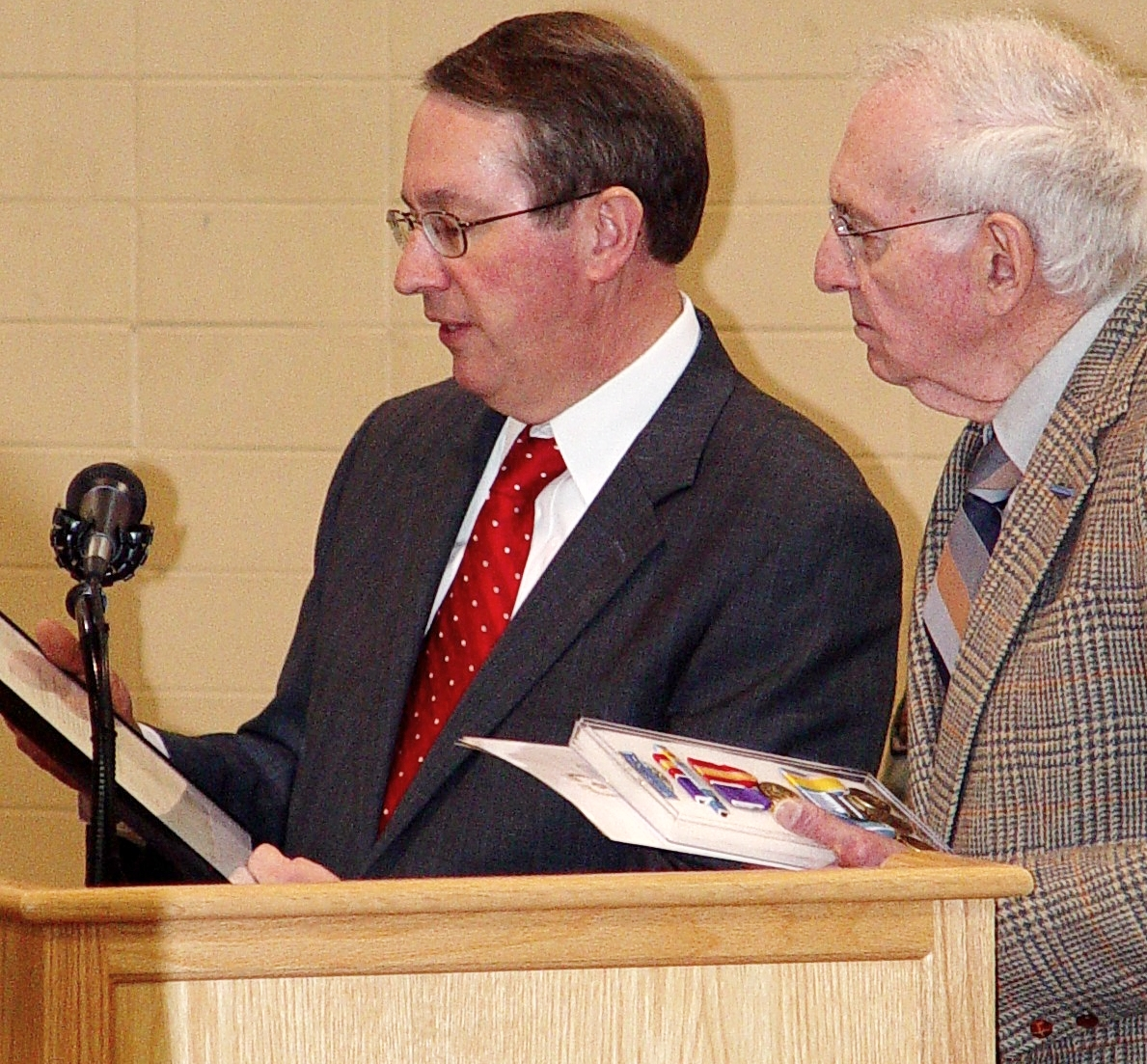
US Congressman Bob Goodlatte (left) presents a ROKWSM and other honors to a Korean War veteran in 2009.

While a number of countries accepted the medal, at the time of the Korean War Service Medal's presentation to UN troops the United States of America declined to award the medal to US soldiers. This was based on regulations of the time which curtailed the acceptance and wear of foreign decorations on US military uniforms; the US Congress changed the law on May 8, 1954. Although subsequently some veterans attempted to have the award accepted, the Korean War Service Medal faded into history after the war and was not heard of again until 1996. At that time the Army noted that it could find no record that the South Korean government ever offered the medal to the Department of Defense. This was technically true since the original offer was made to the United Nations Command. The Army took the position that unless the South Korean government resurrected their original offer, it was "not in a position to officially recognize or approve acceptance of the medal." Although some photographs show the Korean War Service Medal displayed with a Taeguk on the suspension ribbon of the medal, this is not authorized and indicates that it is a photo of a reproduction medal.

On August 20, 1999, Francis M. Rush Jr., Principal Deputy Assistant Secretary of the Army authorized the Korean War Service Medal for distribution and wear by service members of the United States military. The task of issuing the medal was assigned to Randolph Air Force Base while the National Personnel Records Center was responsible for providing documentation to verify eligibility and updating military records to show receipt of the award.

On May 13, 2000, the South Korean government announced it would provide the medal at no cost to eligible Korean War veterans for the years 2000 to 2003 (50th anniversary of Korean War, 1950 to 1953). The two governments held 50th anniversary ceremonies during that time period. The U.S. Air Force was the designated agency to receive and designate the medals.

==== 50th anniversary medals ====
The 50th anniversary of the Korean War: The blue boxes for the medal from South Korea has written in English, "Korean War Service Medal", the reverse side of the enclosed medal is inscribed in Korean writing, "6.25 Incident Participation Medal".

== See also ==
- List of military decorations
- Awards and decorations of the United States military
