= Standard form =

Standard form may refer to a way of writing very large or very small numbers by comparing the powers of ten. It is also known as Scientific notation. Numbers in standard form are written in this format: a×10^{n} Where a is a number 1 ≤ a < 10 and n is an integer.

In mathematics and science:

- Canonical form
- Standard form (Ax + By = C) – a common form of a linear equation
- The more common term for normalised scientific notation in British English and Caribbean English

In government:

- Standard Form (SF) is the name of a set of forms used in the U.S. Federal Government for a wide variety of purposes, dozens of such forms are listed on the United States Office of Personnel Management website. For one example: Standard Form 50 (or SF-50), is a Notification of Personnel Action, maintained by the National Personnel Records Center of the National Archives and Records Administration (NARA).
