= Sison =

Sison can refer to:

- Sison, Pangasinan, Philippines
- Sison, Surigao del Norte, Philippines
- Sison (plant), a genus of plants in the family Apiaceae
- Sison (surname), which includes a list of people with this name

== See also ==
- Sisson, a surname
