= National Archives at College Park =

Archive facility in Maryland, US

Coordinates: 39°00′04″N 76°57′34″W

"Archives II", a newer research and storage facility of the National Archives, in the Maryland suburbs of Washington

The National Archives at College Park (also known as Archives II) is a major facility of the National Archives and Records Administration of the United States which is located in College Park, Maryland. The facility serves as the primary base of operations for the bulk of the senior offices within the organization of the National Archives. The facility operates in tandem with the National Archives Building in Washington, D.C. which serves as the ceremonial headquarters of the National Archives in that this is where the Archivist of the United States maintains their primary office.

== History ==
The National Archives building at College Park held its groundbreaking in 1989 and opened in 1994 on a parcel of campus donated by the University of Maryland, mostly to alleviate space constraints at the aged National Archives Building in Washington, D.C. By that time, the original facility had become incapable of holding further numbers of records transferred in from various branches of the government. Due to its more modern facilities, the Archives at College Park quickly assumed a role as the de facto headquarters of the National Archives, hosting several of the more important operational and administrative offices. Officially, the seat of the National Archives remains at the National Archives building in Washington, D.C.

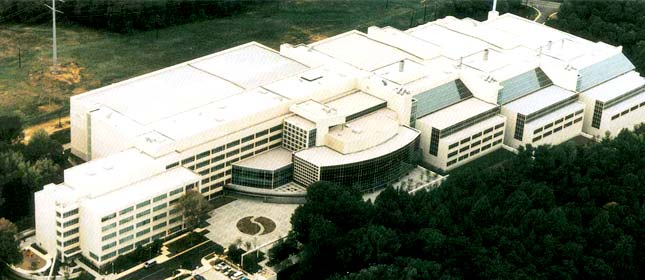
Aerial view of the facility in 1998

== Holdings ==
The National Archives at College Park primarily holds government records of the 20th century and receives current holdings from the 21st century as they become available from government agencies. The center also possesses a small number of 19th century (and earlier) records; however, the bulk of these historic holdings are maintained at the National Archives Building in Washington. A security vault is maintained at College Park which contains high profile historical artifacts. Among these include burned wreckage from the Branch Davidian compound in Waco, Texas as well as the last will and testament of Adolf Hitler.

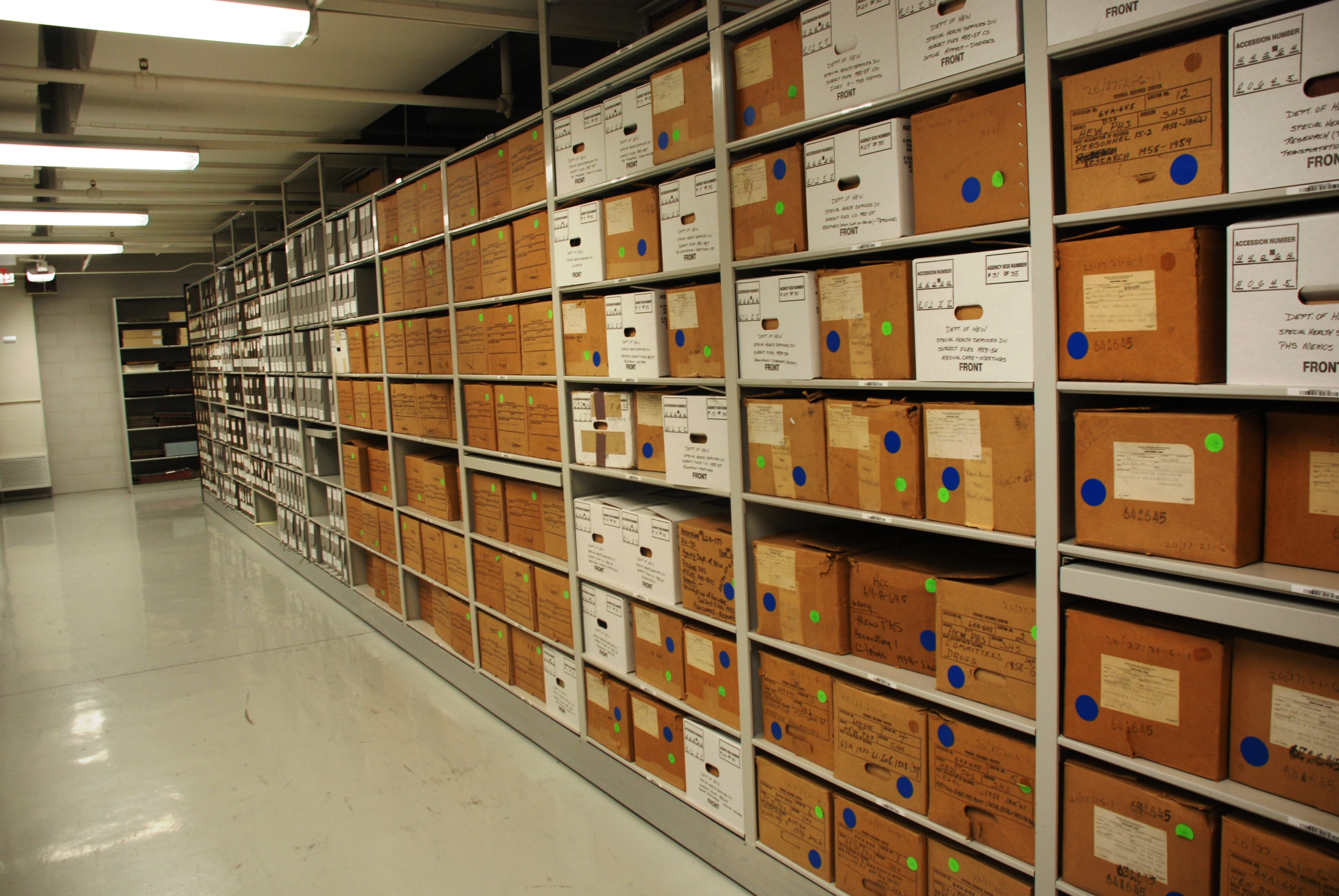
Storage area

Approximately 80% of the records on file at College Park are open to the public. The remainder are considered classified records and may only be reviewed by authorized government agencies. For records which contain personally identifiable information, but which are not classified, the National Archives at College Park maintains a Special Access Office (typically known as the "FOIA branch") which reviews and redacts records prior to release to a public researcher.

In 1995, the Berlin Document Center provided to the National Archives at College Park a large number of microfiche records relating to Nazi Germany. These included service records of the SS, SA, NSDAP, as well as German governmental ministry records from World War II. The center did not transfer personnel records of the regular German armed forces, which are maintained still at various facilities in Germany.

== Organization ==
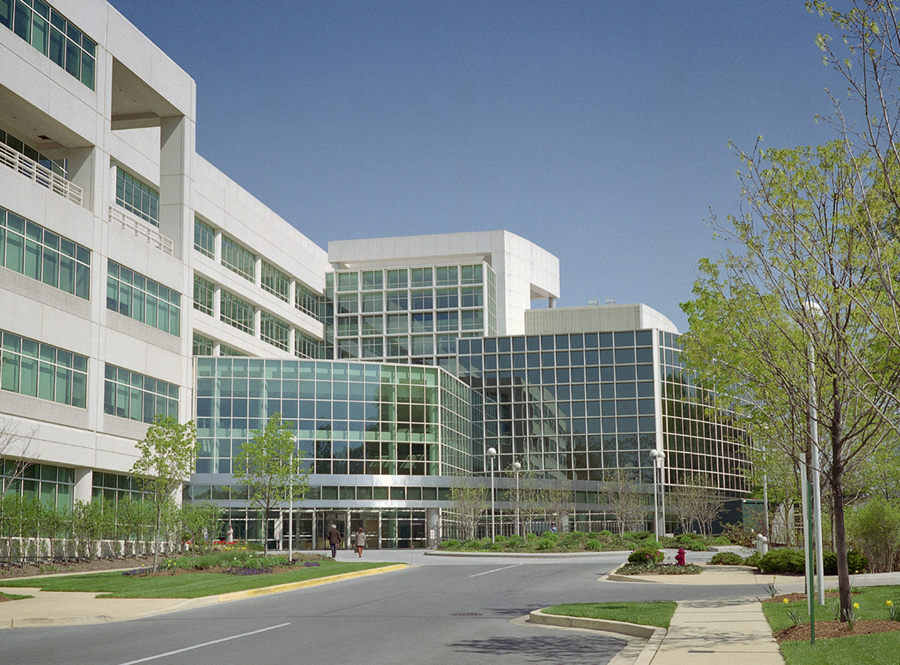
National Archives at College Park

The National Archives at College Park is overseen by the Access Coordinator for the Washington, D.C. archives region. The building does not have a single director, but is instead divided into several divisions which maintain day-to-day operations. The building also contains the office of the chief operating officer as well as several other senior National Archives executives. The Archivist of the United States maintains an auxiliary office on the premises, but mostly conducts business from the archives building in Washington.

=== Research Room operations ===
The National Archives at College Park maintains the most number of research rooms of any National Archives facility, in total there are five separate research rooms including a researcher orientation and registration center. The research rooms are organized as follows.

- 1st Floor: Researcher Registration and Orientation
- 2nd Floor: Textual Research Room
- 3rd Floor: Cartographic Research Room
- 4th Floor: Microfilm Research Room and Moving Image and Sound Research Room
- 5th Floor: Photographic Research Room
- 6th Floor: Classified Research Room

The director of research room operations also oversees "pull and refile section" which physically retrieve records from the archival record area and deliver them to on-site researchers in the research room. Written correspondence concerning reference requests is handled through the Textual Records Division which is a separate office from the research room.

=== Textual Records ===
The Textual Records Division of Archives II prepares records for release to the public and also responds to written inquires concerning records already on file. Until 2020, the three main branches of the textual records division were:

- Accessioning: Physically receives records into the National Archives from government agencies. The Accessioning Branch is divided into two divisions, the first for records which are automatically and annually transferred to the National Archives each year (known as "Annual Move" records) while the second division deals with records which are offered to the National Archives on a case by case basis from the government (known as "Direct Offer" records). A small portion of the Accessioning office is also devoted to reviewing donated records to the National archives, which are known as "gifted" records.
- Processing: The Processing Branch organizes newly received records into understandable and coherent files which may be easily understood by researchers. This normally involves creating file lists for records and reboxing the records into user friendly containers rather than the shipping type boxes in which records are provided by the government. The Processing Branch further enters records information into the National Archives Catalog.
- Reference: The Reference Branch of Textual Records responds to all written correspondence concerning the holdings at College Park and provides referral information for other records in other National Archives facilities. The reference archivists also work in tandem with research room operations and provide on-site consultation for researchers seeking specific types of records. There are two divisions of the reference branch respectively, concerning military records and records of the civilian United States government. Military records at College Park pertain primarily to organizational records, orders, and after action reports. Military personnel records of individual service members are stored at the Military Personnel Records Center in St. Louis.

Beginning in 2020, the Textual Records Division of Archives II underwent a major reorganization where the offices of Accessioning, Processing, and Reference were merged into two new offices as follows:

- Accessioning, Basic Processing, & Holdings Security
- Reference, Research Rooms, & Augmented Processing

The merger also placed operation of the research rooms, previously as their own office branch, under the Textual Records Division and further divided into:

- Reference and Researcher Registration
- Research Room Pulls and Monitoring

=== Special Media records ===
Special media records at College Park include cartographic, photographic, and record series consisting of motion pictures which includes records on videotape. The special media records division also maintains two conservation labs for film preservation as well as the upkeep of records on cassette tape. Records on microfilm are typically not considered special media, but rather as regular textual records.

=== Electronic records ===
Beginning in the early 2000s, the National Archives began a dedicated effort to provide specific records support for electronic data. The Electronic Records Division is essentially a mirror of the textual (paper) division of the National Archives at College Park and contains its own accessioning, processing and reference branch for dealing with electronic records. The branch also maintains a "Digital Preservation Service Office" for the upkeep of records in electronic format.

== Relationship to Archives I ==
To avoid duplicate offices, the National Archives at College Park oversees several of the functions of the main National Archives building in downtown Washington. The overseen offices are known as "Archives I offices" and consist of the Archives I Research Room, overseen by Research Room operations in College Park, as well as the Archives I Processing Branch which is considered an extension of the processing office of Archives II.

All references correspondence from the Archives I building is under direction of the Archives II Textual Records Division. The intake and accessioning of all records to Archives I (which in the modern day are few) is also overseen by College Park and Archives I does not maintain an independent accessioning office.
