= Guanzon =

Guanzón is a Hispanized Hokkien surname. Notable people with the surname include:

- Bobby Guanzon (1948–2016), Filipino radio and television broadcaster and politician
- Rowena Guanzon (born 1957), Filipino lawyer and politician

== See also ==
- Hispanized Filipino-Chinese surnames
