= Hispanicized Filipino-Chinese surnames =

The majority of the Chinese diaspora in the Philippines is made up of Fujianese descent, with a small percentage of Cantonese from Guangdong and Hong Kong. During the Spanish & Iberian period, many Chinese from Fujian were enticed by the Galleon Trade, which was one of the main reasons for the influx of Chinese in the Philippines. Those who converted to Catholicism were placed in Binondo, and those who did not were in Parian. Having a Hispanicised Filipino-Chinese surname signifies that a Chinese person has become a Roman Catholic. Some adopted the surnames of their Spanish godparents, while others combined modified Chinese names and added honorifics such as -co, -son, and -zon at the end. Many of them intermarried with Filipinos and were integrated into Philippine colonial society. Filipinos who possess such surnames have Chinese lineage.

== Hispanicised surnames ==
“ * ” = of Cantonese Origin

A

- Ahkiong (Ah-Kiong)
- Andicoy (An-Dy-Khoe)
- Angangco (Ang-Ang-Ko)
- Angpauco (Ang-Pau-Ko)
- Angtuaco (Ang-Tua-Ko)
- Ausan (Au-San)*
- Ayson(Ai-Son)
- Ayzon(Ai-Son)
- Atienza (Tin-Sa)*

B

- Banzon(Ban-Son)
- Bauzon (Bau-Son)*
- Bee
- Bengco (Beng-Ko)
- Bengzon (Beng-Son)
- Besuena (Bui-Suen-Jau)*
- Besonia (Bui-Sun-Jau)*
- Biazon (Bia-Son)
- Bonzon (Bon-Son)
- Builag (Bui-Lak)
- Buncio (Pun-Siew)
- Buyco (Bui-Ko)*
- Buzon (Bu-Son)

C

- Caipoco (Kai-Po-Ko)
- Ci
- Cangco (Kang-Ko)
- Cayco (Kei-Ko)*
- Chanchinco (Chan-Chin-Ko)*
- Chanco (Chan-Ko)*
- Chantengco (Chan-Teng-Ko)
- Chengcuenca (Cheng-Kwan-Kah)*
- Chichioco (Chi-Chiu-Ko)
- Chincuanco
- Chiongbian (Chiong-Bian)
- Chionglo (Chiong-Lo)
- Chipeco
- Choa
- Choochan
- Chen
- Chuachiaco
- Chuakay
- Chuapoco
- Chuaquico
- Chuateco
- Chuatoco
- Chuidian
- Ciciongco
- Cinco (Sing-Ko)
- Ciocon
- Cobankiat
- Cojuangco (Ko-Huang-Ko)
- Cojunco
- Colayco
- Concon
- Congco
- Congson (Kong-Son)
- Consunji (Kong-Son-Ji)
- Copiaco
- Coquia
- Coquico
- Coseteng
- Cosico
- Cotaco
- Cucueco
- Cuizon
- Cutiongco (Ko-Tiong-Ko)
- Cuyegkeng

D

- De Pan
- Deonzon (Tian-Son)?
- Dimson
- Dinglasan
- Diokno
- Disuanco
- Diyakson (Dy-Yak-Son)
- Dizon
- Doratan
- DyBesenio
- DyBesuena
- DyBesuna
- Dy-Buncio (Dy-Pun-Siew)
- Dycaico
- Dyhongpo (Dy-Hong-Po)
- Dyliaco
- Dypiangco (Dy-Piang-Ko)
- Dyquiangco (Dy-Khian-Ko)
- Dysangco

E

- Eng

F

- Foo

G

- Gandionco
- Ganzon
- Gocheco
- Goh
- Gochoco
- Goduco
- Goking
- Gokongwei (Guo-Kong-Wei)
- Golamco (Guo-Lam-Ko)
- Golangco
- Golingco
- Goquingco
- Goquiolay
- Gosiengfiao
- Gosiengpao
- Gosioco
- Gosoc
- Gosuico (Guo-Sui-Ko)
- Gosum
- Gotauco
- Gotiangco
- Gotianse
- Gouchico
- Goyanco
- Gozon (Go-Sun)*
- Gozun
- Guanlao (Guan-Lao)
- Guanzon
- Guiao
- Guysayko
- Guytingco

H

- Henson
- Hizon (Hie-Son)
- Hongteico
- Hua

I

- Inchoco
- Ison
- Itchon

J

- Jante
- Japson
- Joco (Ho-Ko)
- Jocson (Hok-Son)
- Joson (Ho-Son)
- Junco

K

- Kawson
- Kiamco
- Kilayko (Ki-Lei-Ko)*
- Kimpo (Kim-Po)
- Kison

L

- Lacson
- Landicho
- Lo
- Lantin
- Laoinco
- Lauchengco
- Laudico
- Lauzon
- Lawsin
- Leyson
- Liamzon
- Libongco
- Licauco (Lee-Gao-Ko)*
- Lichauco (Lee-Chau-Ko)*
- Licuanan
- Lam-co
- Limcaco (Lim-Ka-Ko)
- Limcang
- Limco (Lim Koh)
- Limcangco
- Limcaoco
- Lee
- Limchangco
- Limdico
- Limjap
- Limjoco
- Limson
- Liongson
- Lising
- Litonjua
- Littaua
- Livioko (Li-Biu-Ko)
- Loangco (Lo-Ang-Ko)
- Locsin (Lok-Sin)
- Lopa
- Luansing
- Lubangco

M

- Mapua
- Monton
- Monzon

N

- Nacu (Na-Ko)
- Nangpi (Na-Ng-Pi)
- NgSinco (Ng-Sing-Ko)*
- Nibungco

O

- Olimpo
- Olivo (Oh-Li-Koh)*
- Ongchangco
- Ongkeko
- Ongkingco
- Onglatco
- Ongoco
- Ongpauco
- Ongpin
- Ongsiaco
- Ongsiapco
- Ongsingco
- Ongsuco
- Ongtengco
- Ongtangco

P

- Paulin (Pau-Lin different from Pauline)
- Pe-Benito
- Pecaoco (Pe-Gao-Ko)
- Pecson (Pek-Son)
- Pefianco (Beh-Pian-Ko)
- Pesayco

Q

- Quengua
- Quetua (Que-Tua)
- Queveco
- Quiambao
- Quiason
- Quiboloy (Que-Bu-Lui)
- Quibuyen
- Quicho
- Quimbo
- Quimpo
- Quimque
- Quimson
- Quindipan
- Quingco
- Quiocho
- Quiocson
- Quiogue
- Quison / Quizon / Quezon (Que-Son)
- Quisumbing

S

- Samson
- Sanson
- Sandico
- Sangco
- Sanqui
- Sason
- Sayson
- Sendico
- Sia
- Siok
- Siapuatco
- Siazon
- SibayanSy
- Sicangco
- Sideco
- Simsuangco
- Simtoco
- Sindico
- Siquaico
- Singco
- Singson
- Sinlao
- Siongco
- Sioson
- Sipin
- Sison
- Songco
- Songcuya
- Soyangco
- Suaco
- Suansing
- Suico
- Sunico
- Suntay
- Sycip
- Sy-Cotio
- Syjuco
- Syquia
- Sytangco
- Sytengco
- Syyap (Sy-Yap)

T

- Tiayuco
- Tambunting
- Tanangco
- Tanchanco
- Tanchoco
- Tancinco
- Tancongco
- Tangco
- Tangkiang
- Tanhehco
- Tanhueco
- Tanjosoy
- Tanjuatco
- Tanjuakio
- Tanlimco
- Tanpiengco
- Tanquingcen
- Tanseco
- Tansiongco
- Tantengco
- Tantoco
- Tytanco
- Tantuico
- Tecson
- Teehankee
- Tengco
- Tengonciang
- Tsen
- Tetangco
- Teves (Tan/Chen)
- Tiamson
- Tiangco
- Tiaoqui
- Tichepco
- Timkang
- Tingkingco
- Tinoco
- Tinsay
- Tintiangco
- Tioleco
- Tiongco
- Tiongson
- Tioseco
- Tiotuyco
- Tizon
- Tongson
- Tuason
- Tuico

U

- Uichico
- Uson
- Uylamco
- Uytangco
- Uytengsu
- Uytingco
- Uysiuseng

V

- Vianzon
- Villamil (Bee)
- Vinzon
- Vytiaco

W

- Wilwayco
- Wycoco

Y

- Yalung
- Yambao
- Yamson
- Yao
- Yanson
- Yance
- Yapchulay
- Yapjoco
- Yaptangco
- Yaptenco
- Yaptinchay
- Yatco
- Yengko
- Yongque
- Yuchengco
- Yukuesiang
- Yuhico
- Yujico
- Yulo
- Yusay
- Yunsay
- Yupangco
- Yusingco
- Yuson / Yuzon
- Yuviengco
- Yuyitung

Z

- Zhiang

== See also ==
- Catholic Church in the Philippines
- Spanish naming customs
- Filipino name
- Chinese name
- Wiktionary:Appendix:Filipino surnames
