= United States Naval Academy Museum =

Maritime museum in Maryland, United States

U.S. Naval Academy Museum
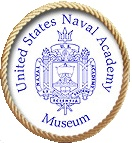

- Location within Maryland
- Location: Annapolis, Maryland
- Coordinates: 38.9828°N 76.4872°W
- Type: Maritime museum
- Website: www.usna.edu/Museum

The United States Naval Academy Museum is a public maritime museum in Annapolis, Maryland, United States. A part of the United States Naval Academy, it is located at Preble Hall on the academy premises. The museum occupies 12,000 square feet (1,100 m^{2}) with four galleries.

== History ==
The museum's history dates back to 1845, when it was founded as the Naval School Lyceum. In 1849, President James K. Polk directed the Navy's collection of historic flags be sent to the new Naval School at Annapolis for care and display, establishing one of the museum's oldest collections. After the Civil War, the Navy Department began forwarding many types of objects to the Naval Academy Lyceum, including trophies of war, items from exploration/survey expeditions, diplomatic missions, and naval related art. The Lyceum also became the repository for the collections of the U. S. Naval Lyceum at the New York Navy Yard in 1892, and received an extensive collection from the Boston Naval Library and Institute in 1922, significantly growing the collection.

The Naval Academy Lyceum of the 19th and early 20th centuries was located in several places around the Naval Academy Yard, before the construction of Preble Hall in 1939. From 2007 to 2008, Preble Hall underwent a complete renovation and reopened in the summer of 2009.

== Collection ==
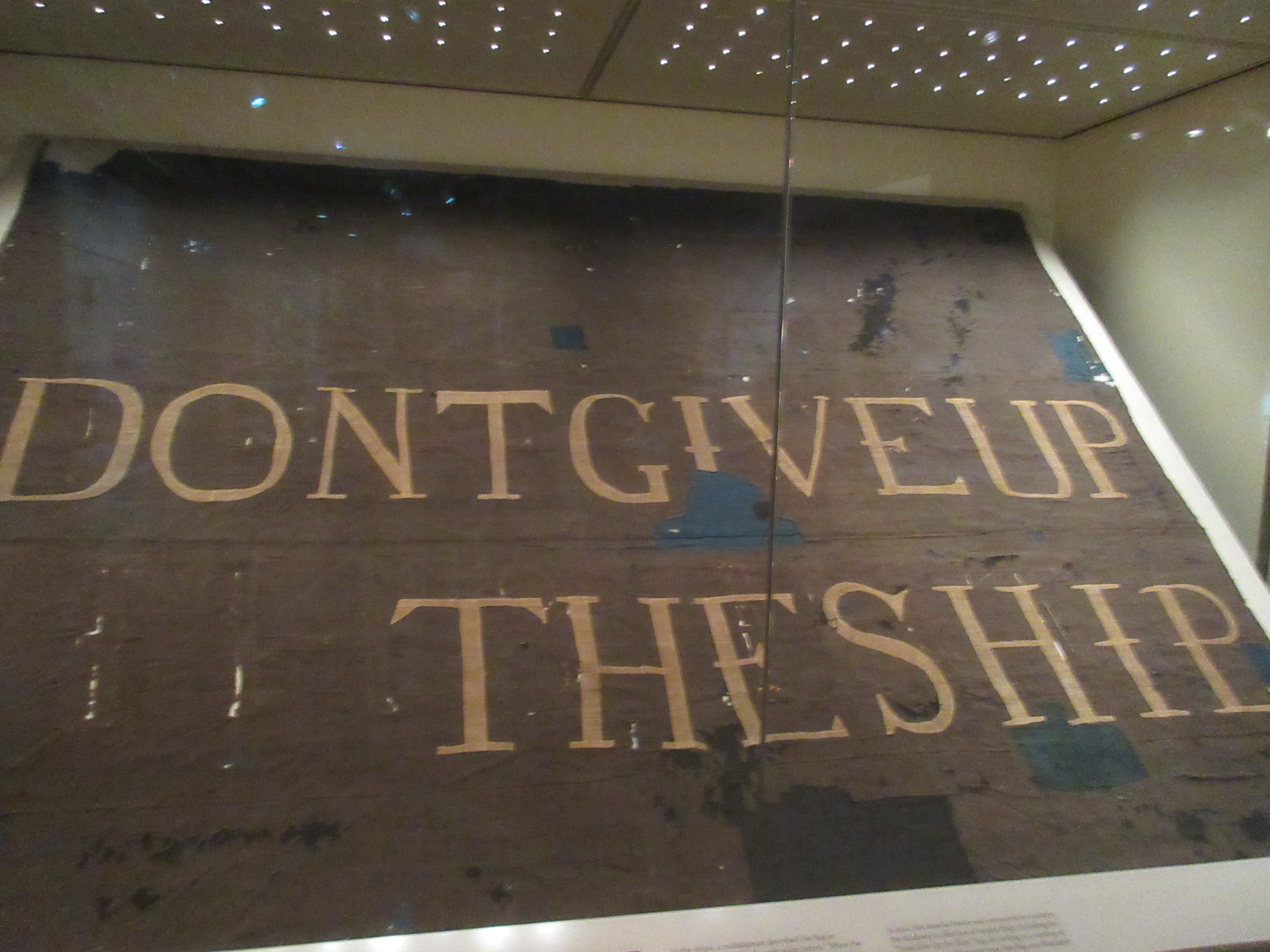
The original flag flown by Oliver Hazard Perry during the Great Lakes naval battles of the War of 1812 is one of the most prominent items in the museum's collections.

The collection reflects much of American naval history and partly the naval forces of other countries. That includes thousands of two- and three-dimensional objects such as flags, uniforms, weapons, medals, books, instruments and photographs as well as art. Major collections are The Rogers Ship Model Collection, the Naval Academy Art Collection (including approx. 1,200 paintings), the Malcolm Storer Naval Medals Collection (including ancient coins) and The Beverley R. Robinson Collection (prints of naval history). It "depicts nearly 160 years of American naval history, from the Revolutionary War to walks on the moon."

== Exhibits and programming ==
Over the years, the museum has created a number of exhibits including: Sea, Sun, and Space, Philo McGiffin: A Man of Wit and Dash, Over There: The Navy and Marine Corps in World War I, Warrior Writers, From Conception to Present: The U.S. Navy's Aircraft Carrier, U.S. Navy Ships of War, and Seas, Lakes & Bay: The Naval War of 1812, and Ability, Not Gender.

It also hosts the Preble Hall Podcast about U.S. Navy and Marine Corps history. It previously produced a podcast called "A History of the Navy in 100 Objects".

== See also ==
- William W. Jeffries Memorial Archives (USNA archives)
- List of museums in Maryland
- List of maritime museums in the United States
