= Catálogo alfabético de apellidos =

Book of surnames in the Spanish East Indies

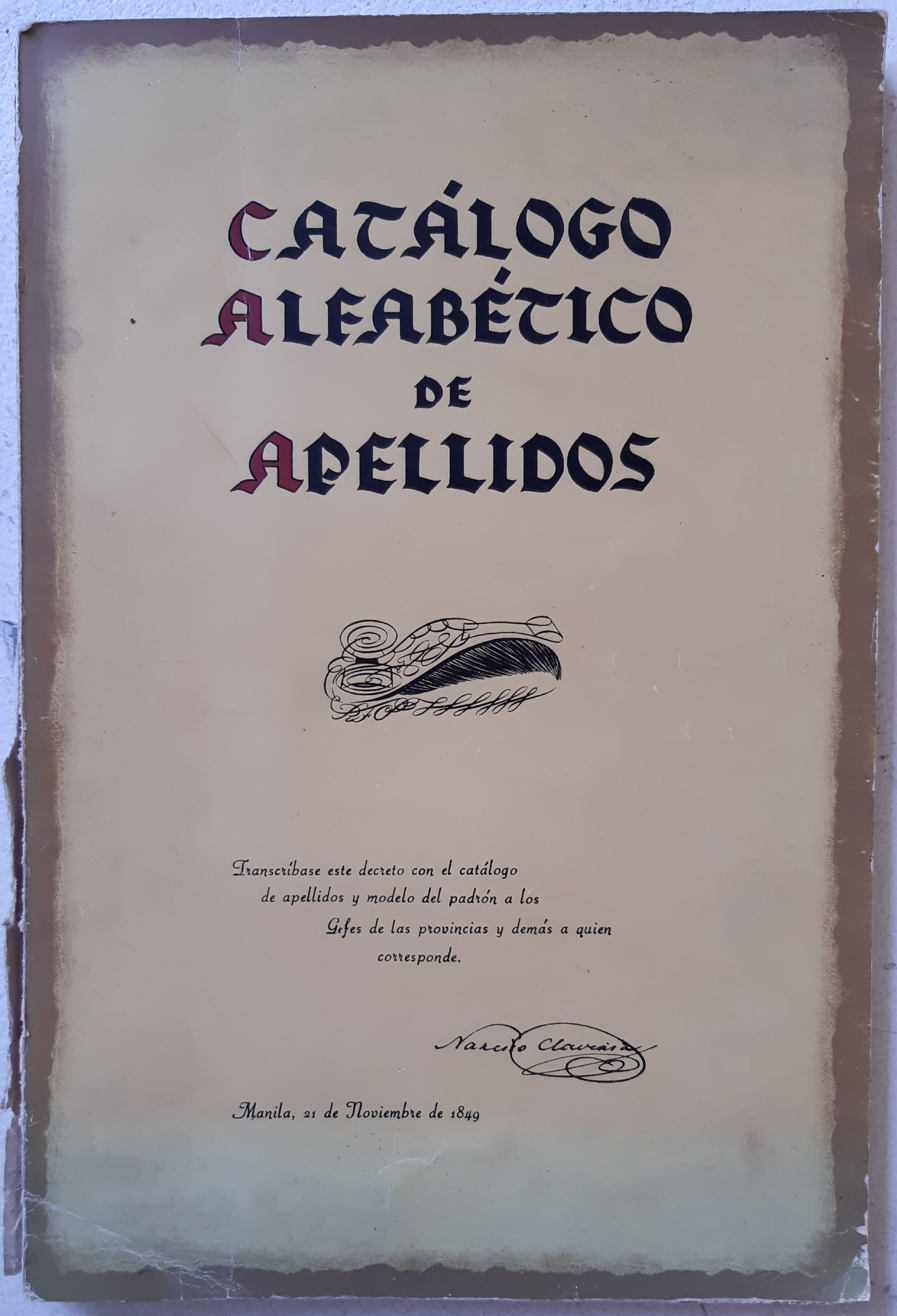
- Author: Narciso Clavería y Zaldúa; Domingo Abella
- Language: Spanish
- Published: 1849 (reprinted in 1973)
- Publisher: Manila : National Archives & Records Administration, Central Plains Region
- Pages: 141

The Catálogo alfabético de apellidos (English: Alphabetical Catalogue of Surnames; Filipino: Alpabetikong Katalogo ng mga apelyido) is a book of surnames in the Philippines and other islands of Spanish East Indies published in the mid-19th century. That was in response to a Spanish colonial decree establishing the distribution of Spanish family names and local surnames among colonial subjects who did not have a prior surname. It is also the reason for Filipinos sharing some of the same surnames as many Spaniards and other Hispanic countries.

The book was created after Spanish governor-general Narciso Clavería y Zaldúa issued a decree on November 21, 1849, to address the lack of a standard naming convention. Newly-Christianised Filipinos often chose the now-ubiquitous surnames of de los Santos, de la Cruz, del Rosario, and Bautista for religious reasons; others preferred names of well-known local rulers such as Lacandola. To complicate matters further, discrepancies like family members holding different surnames would hinder some of the colonial government's activities such as taking a census and tax collection.

== Dissemination of surnames ==
According to the decree, a copy of the catalogue, which contains 61,000 surnames, was to be distributed to the provincial heads of the archipelago. From there, a certain number of surnames, based on population, were sent to each barangay's parish priest. The head of each barangay, along with another town official or two, was present when the father or the oldest person in each family chose a surname for his or her family. A surname is given to only one family per municipality to reduce any issues about surnames being associated with an ethnic background or group affiliation. The dissemination of surnames were also based on the recipient family's origins. For example, surnames starting with "A" were distributed to provincial capitals, "B" surnames were given to secondary towns, and tertiary towns received "C" surnames.

Families were awarded with the surnames or asked to choose from them. However, several groups were exempt from having to choose new surnames:

- Those with a previously adopted surname (whether indigenous or foreign) already on the list or, if not on the list, not prohibited because of ethnic origin or being too common.
- Families who had already adopted a prohibited surname but could prove their family had used the name for at least four consecutive generations. (Those were names prohibited for being too common, like de los Santos or de la Cruz or for other reasons.)

Spanish names are the majority found in the books' list of legitimate surnames. Because of the mass implementation of Spanish surnames in the Philippines, a Spanish surname does not necessarily indicate Spanish ancestry, which can make it difficult for Filipinos to accurately trace their lineage. Surnames from native local languages are also listed, including the first surname in the book, Aacain.

== See also ==
- Filipino name
