= National Archives facilities =

Repositories of U.S. federal government records

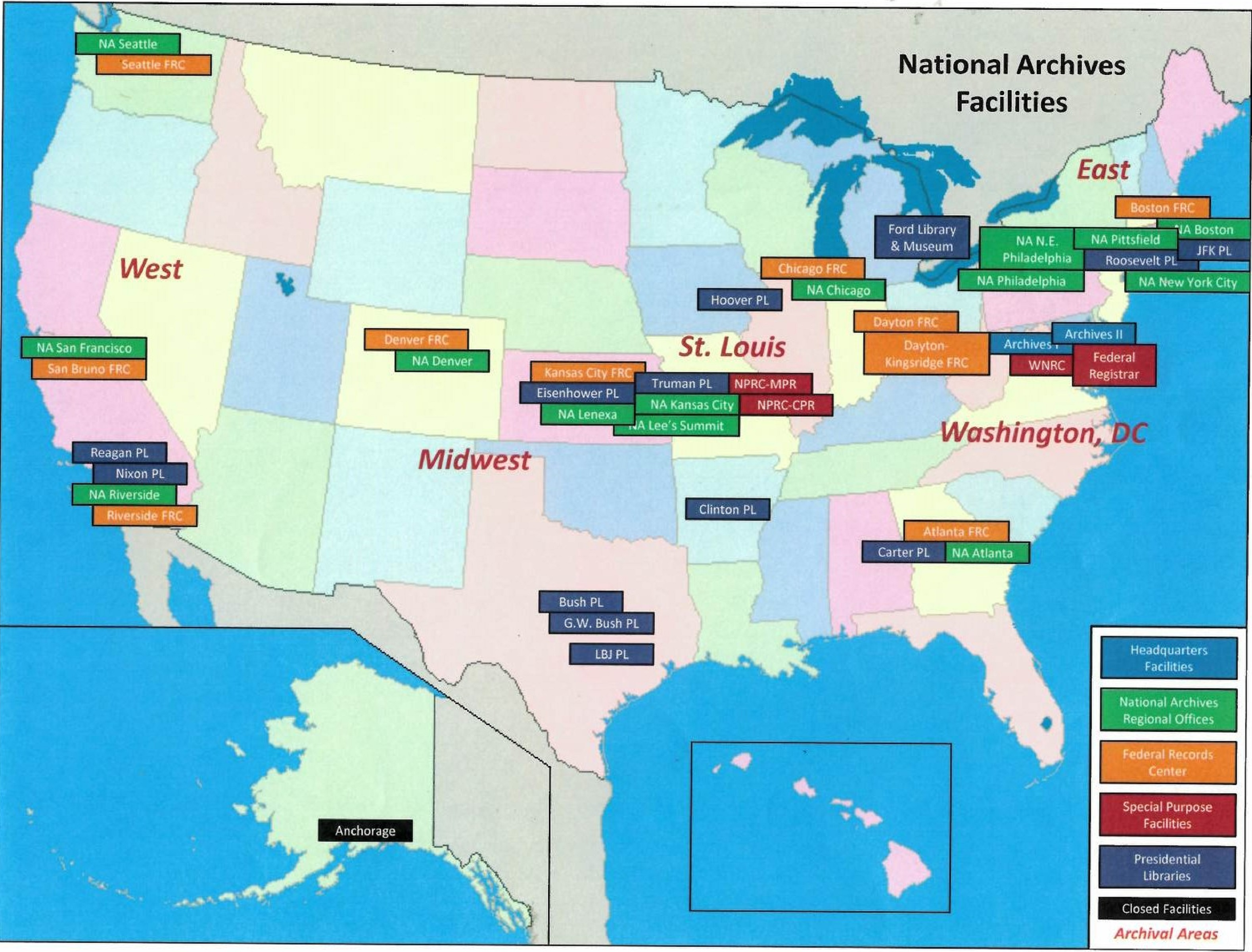
National Archives and Records Administration facilities

The United States National Archives and Records Administration maintains facilities and buildings housing its records and services across the country. Within the organization of the National Archives, the upkeep of its facilities falls under the National Archives Facilities and Property Management Office.

== National Archives Building ==
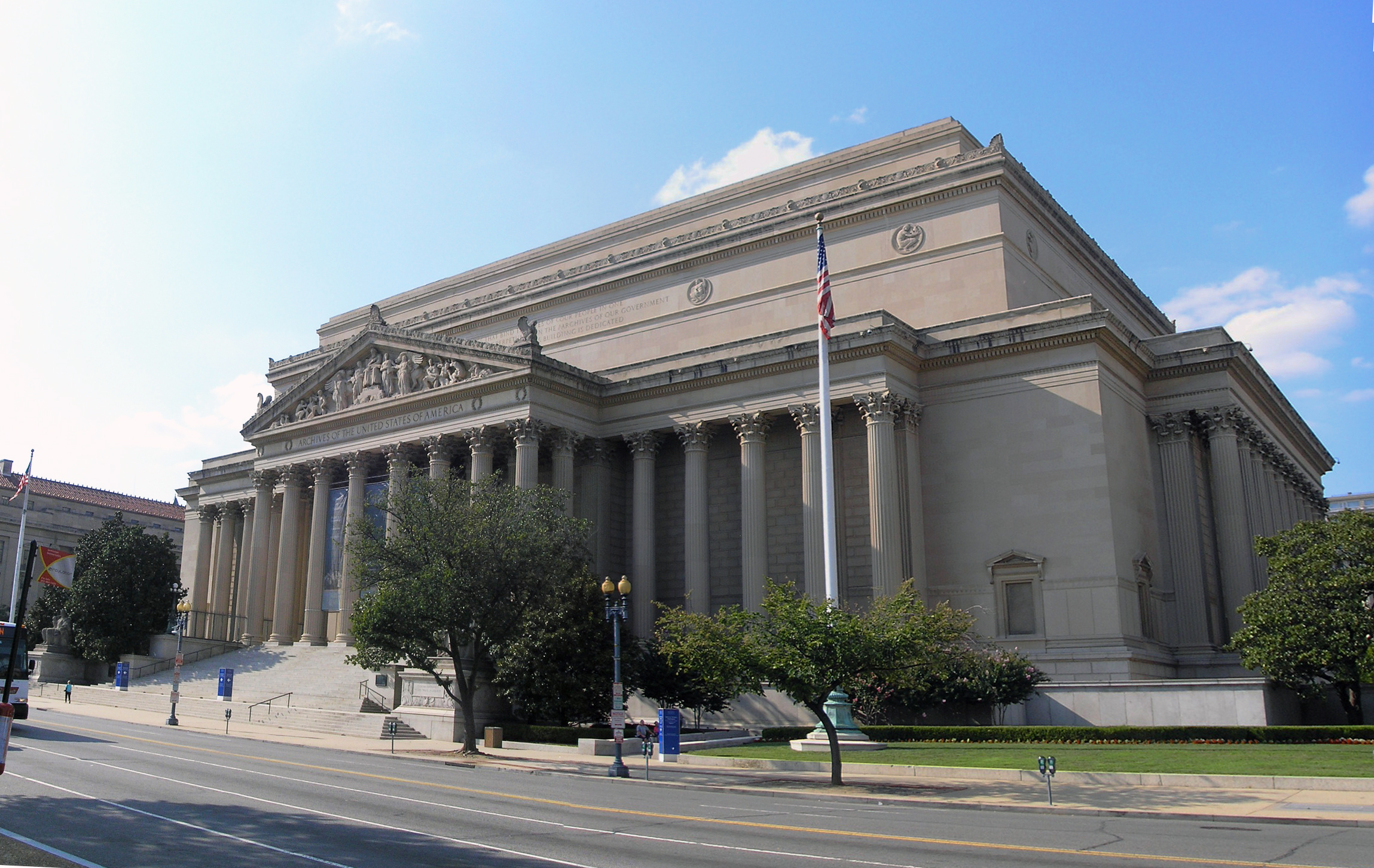
The National Archives Building from Constitution Avenue

The National Archives Building, known informally as Archives I, located north of the National Mall on Constitution Avenue in Washington, D.C., opened as its original headquarters in 1935. It holds the original copies of the three main formative documents of the United States and its government: the Declaration of Independence, the Constitution, and the Bill of Rights. It also hosts a copy of the 1297 Magna Carta confirmed by Edward I. These are displayed to the public in the main chamber of the National Archives, which is called the Rotunda for the Charters of Freedom. The National Archives Building also exhibits other important American historical documents such as the Louisiana Purchase Treaty, the Emancipation Proclamation, and collections of photography and other historically and culturally significant American artifacts.

Once inside the Rotunda for the Charters of Freedom, there are no lines to see the individual documents and visitors are allowed to walk from document to document as they wish. For over 30 years the National Archives have forbidden flash photography but the advent of cameras with automatic flashes have made the rules increasingly difficult to enforce. As a result, all filming, photographing, and videotaping by the public in the exhibition areas has been prohibited since February 25, 2010.

An Innovation Hub provides facilities for the public to access NARA documents and provide metadata. Historical records of the U.S. House of Representatives and the U.S. Senate are available for research at NARA's Center for Legislative Archives.

== National Archives at College Park ==
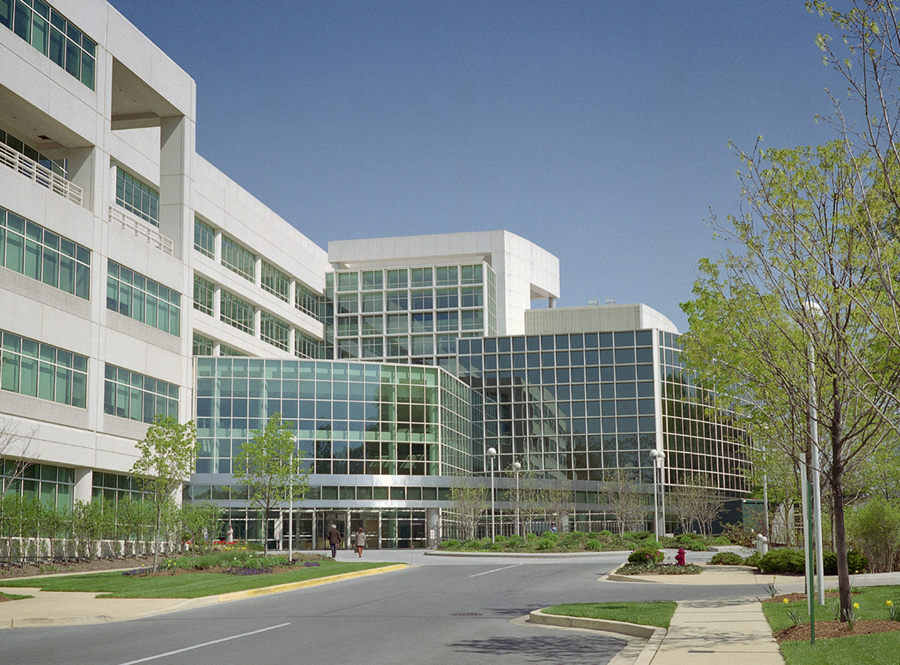
NARA facility near the University of Maryland, College Park

Because of space constraints, NARA opened a second facility, known informally as "Archives II", in 1994 near the University of Maryland, College Park campus (8601 Adelphi Road, College Park, MD, 20740-6001). Largely because of this proximity, NARA and the University of Maryland engage in cooperative initiatives. The College Park campus includes an archaeological site that was listed on the National Register of Historic Places in 1996.

== Washington National Records Center ==
The Washington National Records Center (WNRC), located in Suitland, Maryland, is a large warehouse-type facility which stores records still under the control of the creating federal agency. Said agencies pay a yearly fee for storage at the facility. In accordance with federal records schedules, documents at WNRC are transferred to the legal custody of the National Archives after a certain point (this usually involves a relocation of the records to College Park). Temporary records at WNRC are either retained for a fee or destroyed after retention times has elapsed. WNRC also offers research services and maintains a small research room.

== National Personnel Records Center ==
Two offices in the St. Louis, Missouri area comprise the National Personnel Records Center.

- Spanish Lake, Missouri, Military Personnel Records Center
- Valmeyer, Illinois, Civilian Personnel Records Center,

== Regional facilities ==
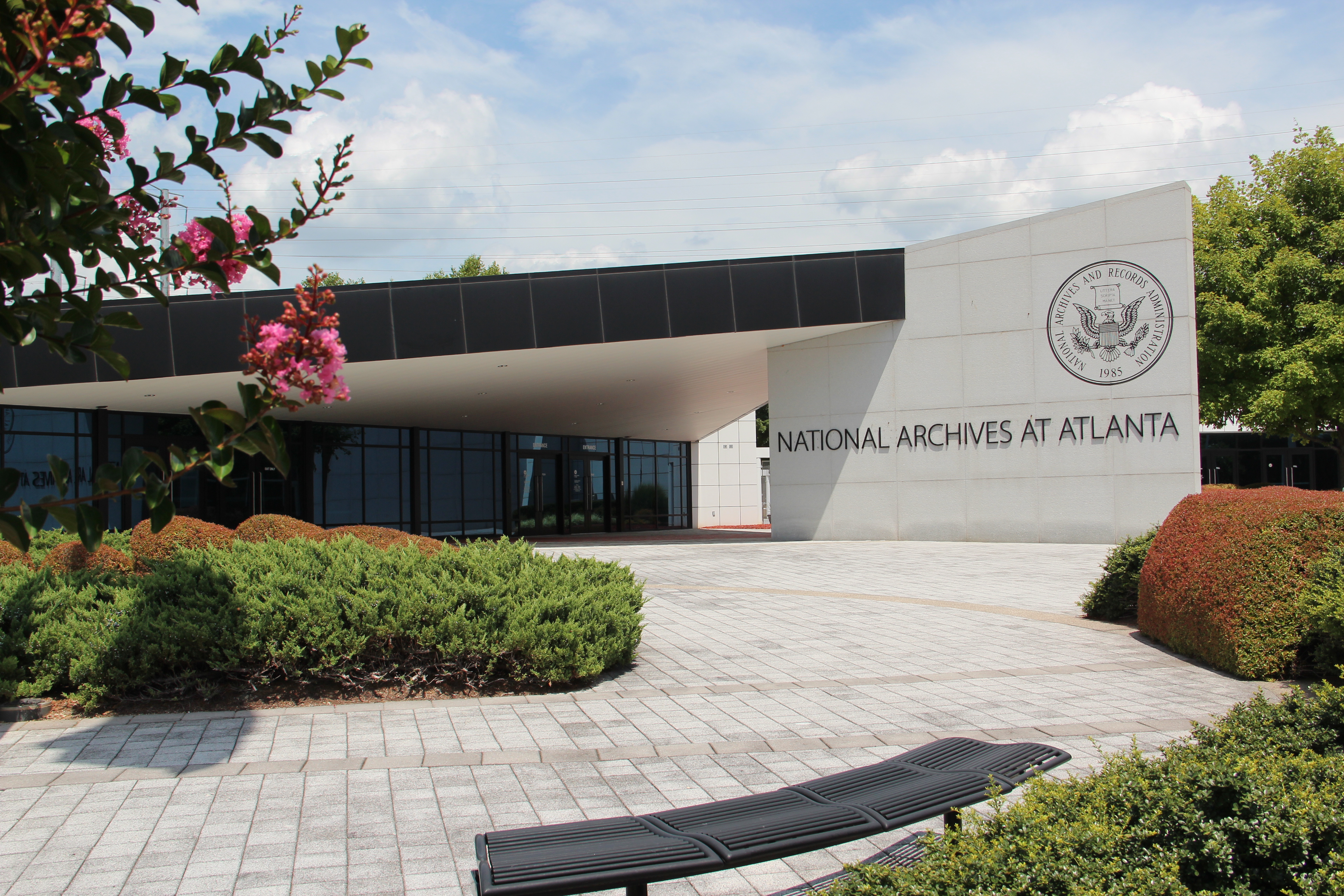
The National Archives at Atlanta facility in Morrow, Georgia

There are facilities across the country with research rooms, archival holdings, and microfilms of documents of federal agencies and courts pertinent to each region.

- National Archives at Atlanta (Morrow, Georgia)
- National Archives at Boston (Waltham, Massachusetts)
- National Archives at Chicago (Chicago, Illinois)
- National Archives at Denver (Broomfield, Colorado)
- National Archives at Fort Worth (Fort Worth, Texas)
- National Archives at Kansas City (Kansas City, Missouri)
- National Archives at Philadelphia (Philadelphia, Pennsylvania)
- National Archives at Riverside (Perris, California)
- National Archives at San Francisco (Leo J. Ryan Federal Building, San Bruno, California)

=== Former locations ===
A regional office in Anchorage was closed in 2014 with records for the region transferred to Seattle. The National Archives at Seattle was planned to be closed by a decision of the U.S. Office of Management and Budget in January 2020, with records moved to California and Kansas City, but the decision was later revised by the Biden administration.

The New York City location, located upstairs from the Museum of the American Indian in the Alexander Hamilton U.S. Custom House, closed in 2024. Their files were relocated to Philadelphia and Kansas City where similar files were already held. This was part of a series of moves which also affected the temporary site of the Barack Obama Presidential Library in Hoffman Estates, IL.

== Federal Records Centers ==
Federal Records Centers (FRCs) exist in each region that house materials owned by federal government agencies. Federal Records Centers are not open for public research but, in many cases, may be housed in the same complex or building as a National Archives regional office. The federal records centers are also administratively divided into two archival divisions.

- Atlanta Federal Records Center (Ellenwood, Georgia)
- Boston Federal Records Center (colocated with the National Archives at Boston)
- Chicago Federal Records Center (colocated with the National Archives at Chicago)
- Dayton Federal Records Center (Moraine, Ohio)
- Denver Federal Records Center (colocated with the National Archives at Denver)
- Fort Worth Federal Records Center (colocated with the National Archives at Fort Worth)
- Kansas City Federal Records Center (SubTropolis, Kansas City, Missouri)
- Kingsridge Federal Records Center (Miamisburg, Ohio)
- Lee's Summit Federal Records Center (Lee's Summit, Missouri)
- Lenexa Federal Records Center (Lenexa, Kansas)
- Philadelphia Federal Records Center (colocated with the National Archives at Philadelphia)
- Pittsfield Federal Records Center (Pittsfield, Massachusetts)
- Riverside Federal Records Center (colocated with the National Archives at Riverside)
- San Bruno Federal Records Center (colocated with the National Archives at San Francisco)
- Seattle Federal Records Center (colocated with the National Archives at Seattle)

The Director of the Federal Records Center Program is considered one of the primary office chiefs in the National Archives Executive for Agency Services. The federal records center program is headquartered at the National Archives at College Park. Both the National Personnel Records Center (NPRC) and the Washington National Records Center (WNRC) are considered part of the federal records center program.

== Presidential libraries ==
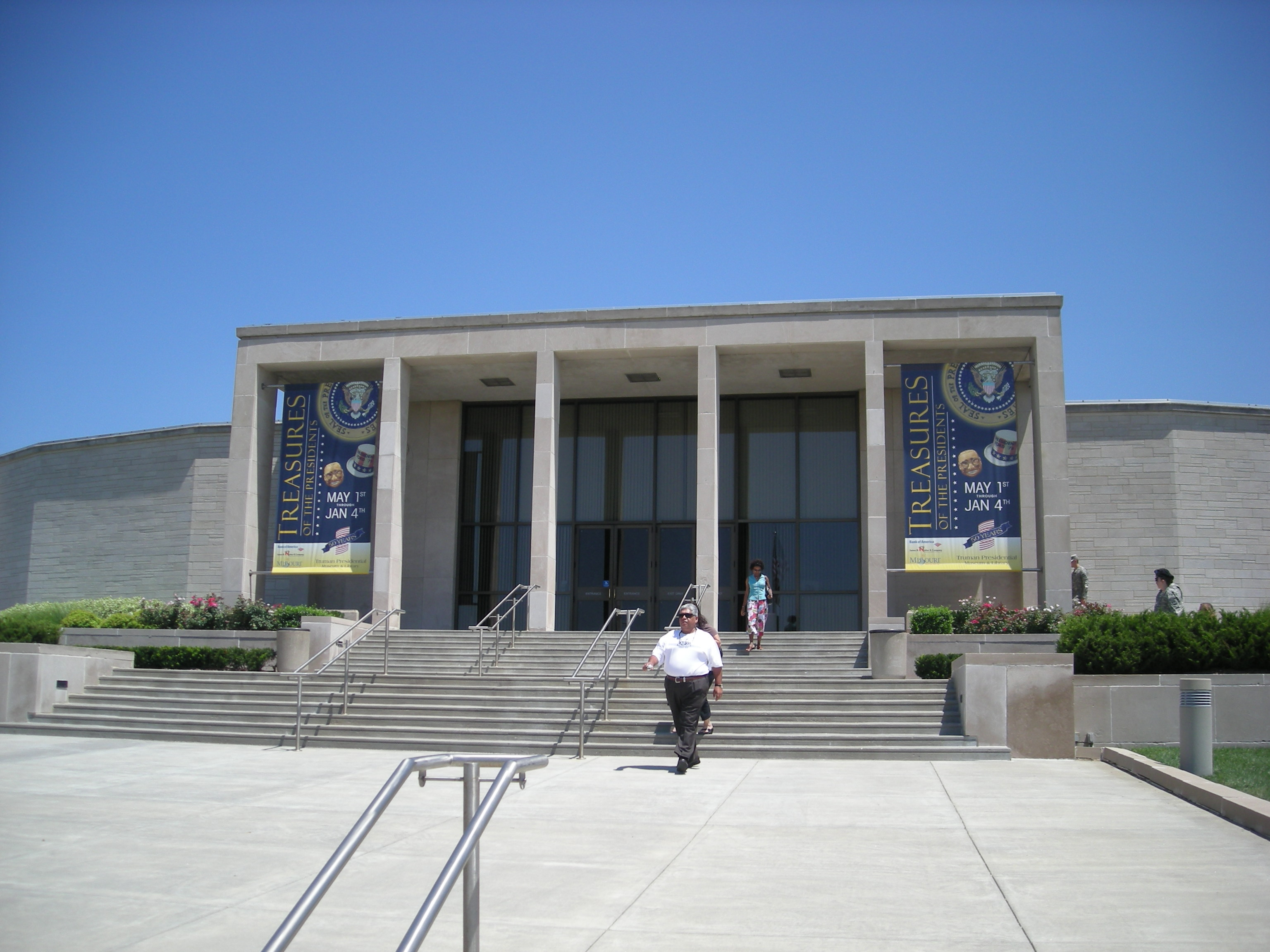
The Truman Presidential Library

NARA also maintains the Presidential Library system, a nationwide network of libraries for preserving and making available the documents of U.S. presidents since Herbert Hoover. The Presidential Libraries include:

- Herbert Hoover Presidential Library in West Branch, Iowa
- Franklin D. Roosevelt Presidential Library in Hyde Park, New York
- Harry S. Truman Presidential Library in Independence, Missouri
- Dwight D. Eisenhower Presidential Library in Abilene, Kansas
- John F. Kennedy Presidential Library in Boston, Massachusetts
- Lyndon B. Johnson Presidential Library in Austin, Texas
- Richard Nixon Presidential Library and Museum in Yorba Linda, California
- Gerald R. Ford Presidential Library in Ann Arbor, Michigan
- Gerald R. Ford Presidential Museum in Grand Rapids, Michigan
- Jimmy Carter Presidential Library in Atlanta, Georgia
- Ronald Reagan Presidential Library in Simi Valley, California
- George Bush Presidential Library in College Station, Texas
- William J. Clinton Presidential Library in Little Rock, Arkansas
- George W. Bush Presidential Library in University Park, Texas

Libraries and museums have been established for other presidents, but they are not part of the NARA presidential library system, and are operated by private foundations, historical societies, or state governments, including the Abraham Lincoln, Rutherford B. Hayes, William McKinley, Woodrow Wilson and Calvin Coolidge libraries. For example, the Abraham Lincoln Presidential Library and Museum is owned and operated by the state of Illinois.

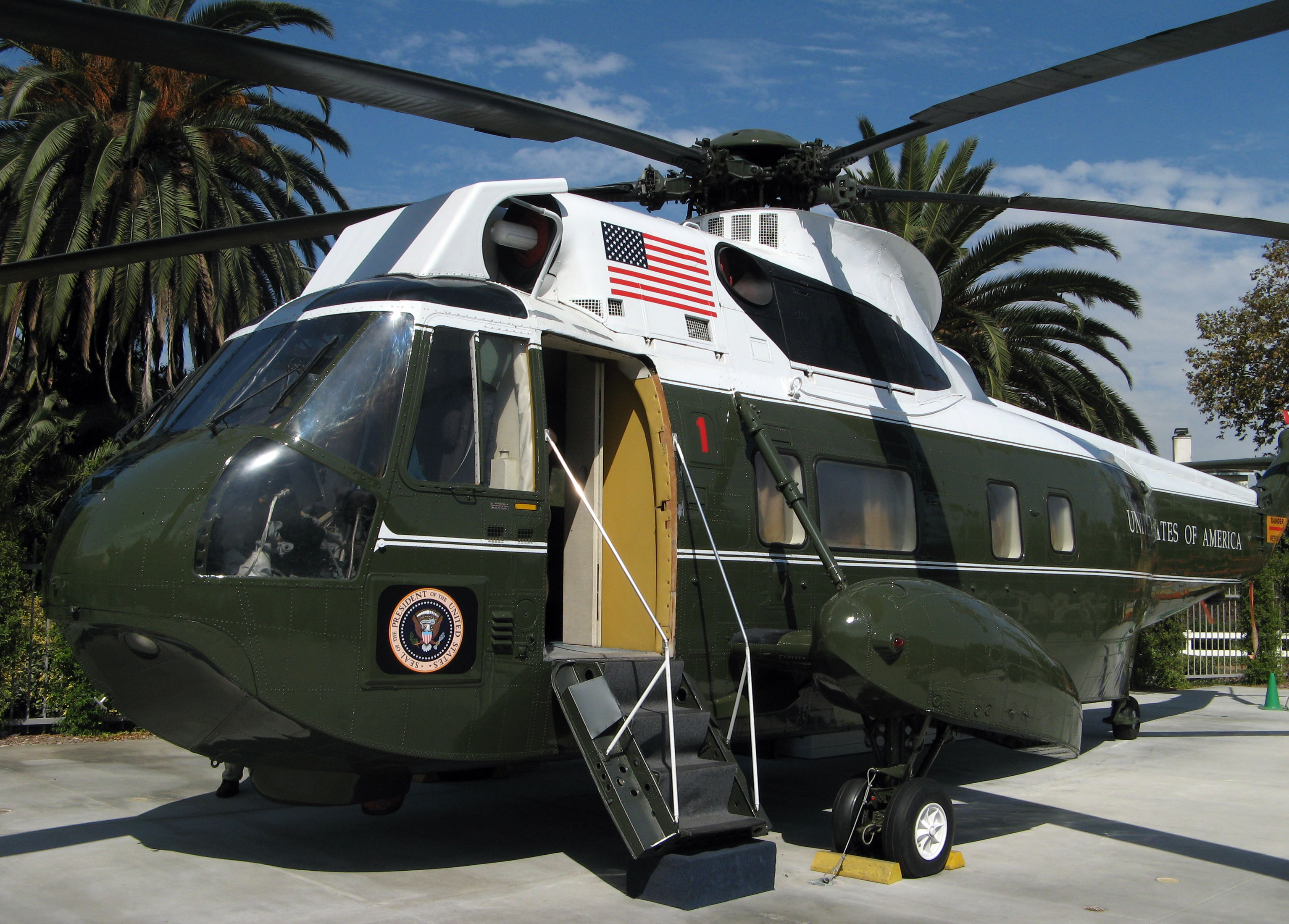
The broad range of material which NARA preserves at the Presidential libraries is exemplified by the President's VH-3A "Sea King" helicopter at the Richard Nixon Presidential Library and Museum.

== Affiliated facilities ==
The National Archives Building in downtown Washington holds record collections such as all existing federal census records, ships' passenger lists, military unit records from the American Revolution to the Philippine–American War, records of the Confederate government, the Freedmen's Bureau records, and pension and land records.

There are also ten affiliated archives across the U.S. which hold, by formal, written agreement with NARA, accessioned records.

- Oklahoma Historical Society, Oklahoma City, Oklahoma
- Pennsylvania State Archives, Bureau of Archives and History, Harrisburg, Pennsylvania
- Prints and Photographs Division, Library of Congress, Washington, D.C.
- State Records Center and Archives, Santa Fe, New Mexico
- U.S. Government Printing Office, Washington, D.C.
- U.S. Military Academy Archives, West Point, New York
- University of North Texas Libraries, Denton, Texas
- William W. Jeffries Memorial Archives, U.S. Naval Academy, Annapolis, Maryland
- Yellowstone National Park Archives, Wyoming

Beginning in 2012, the National Archives began storing closed (classified and privacy protected) records not open to the public, as well as certain lesser used records and files, at contracted storage facilities operated by the records management company "Iron Mountain".

== See also ==
- Founders Online
