= Tecson (surname) =

Tecson is a surname.

In the Philippines, the surname has links with the Chinese diaspora. Notable people with the surname include:

- Trinidad Tecson – known as the "Mother of Biak-na-Bato" and "Mother of Mercy", fought to gain Philippines independence
- Florentino Tecson – a Filipino Visayan lawyer, politician, editor, writer, and labor leader
- Pablo Tecson – an officer in the Revolutionary Army serving under Gen. Gregorio del Pilar and a representative to the Malolos Congress
- Simon Ocampo Tecson – a revolutionary colonel of the Siege of Baler who fought in the Philippine-American War and whose house, the Tecson House, is the place where the ratification of Philippine Constitution took place with Emilio Aguinaldo and was signed; the house was, for some time, used as the headquarters of Aguinaldo
- Richie Ticzon – Filipino professional basketball player and coach
- Major General Arsenio L. Tecson – one of the three generals who fought a ''coup'' staged by the military group Reformed Armed Forces Movement (RAM) to destabilize the administration of Corazon Aquino

== See also ==
- Hispanicized Filipino-Chinese surnames
