= Leo J. Ryan Federal Building =

U.S. government facility

Leo J. Ryan Memorial Federal Building
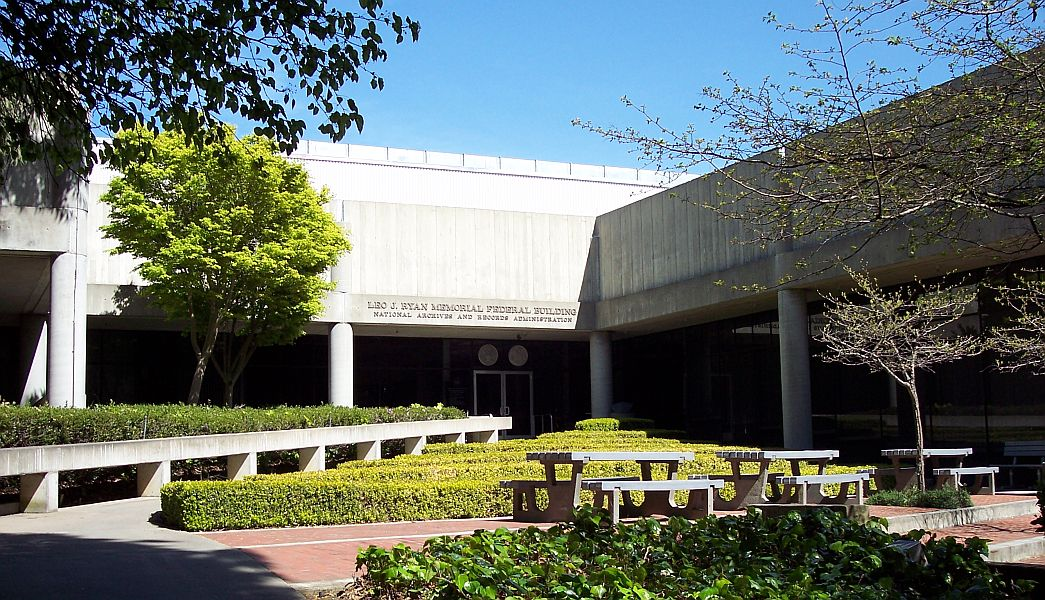
- Interactive map of the Leo J. Ryan Memorial Federal Building area
- Alternative names: Leo Ryan Federal Building; National Archives at San Francisco; San Francisco Federal Records Center; San Bruno Federal Records Center; Leo J. Ryan Memorial Federal Archives and Records Center
- Etymology: Leo J. Ryan

General information
- Type: Archive; Office building; Federal building
- Location: 1000 Commodore Drive, San Bruno, California, United States
- Coordinates: 37°37′55″N 122°25′29″W
- Current tenants: National Archives at San Francisco; San Bruno Federal Records Center
- Completed: 1973
- Client: National Archives and Records Administration
- Owner: United States federal government (General Services Administration)

The Leo J. Ryan Memorial Federal Building, also known as the Leo J. Ryan Memorial Federal Archives and Records Center, is a United States federal government archive and office facility which opened in 1973, and is located in San Bruno, California. It houses the National Archives and Records Administration (NARA) for the Pacific Sierra Region of the United States. The building was posthumously renamed in honor and memory of congressman Leo Ryan, through Congressional legislation which passed in 1984.

The NARA describes the building as "an integral part of the Bay Area's network of world class public historical research centers and cultural institutions." The holdings in the facility are a major primary resource for study in the fields of Asian-Pacific immigration, environmental, Naval, Native American, as well as other aspects of American history, including genealogical records pertaining to the Chinese Exclusion Act.

In 1993, the building underwent accessibility improvements to its architectural design, which were performed by Interactive Resources. The building is owned and managed by the General Services Administration. A San Mateo County publication identified the building as a "local treasure."

== Renaming ==
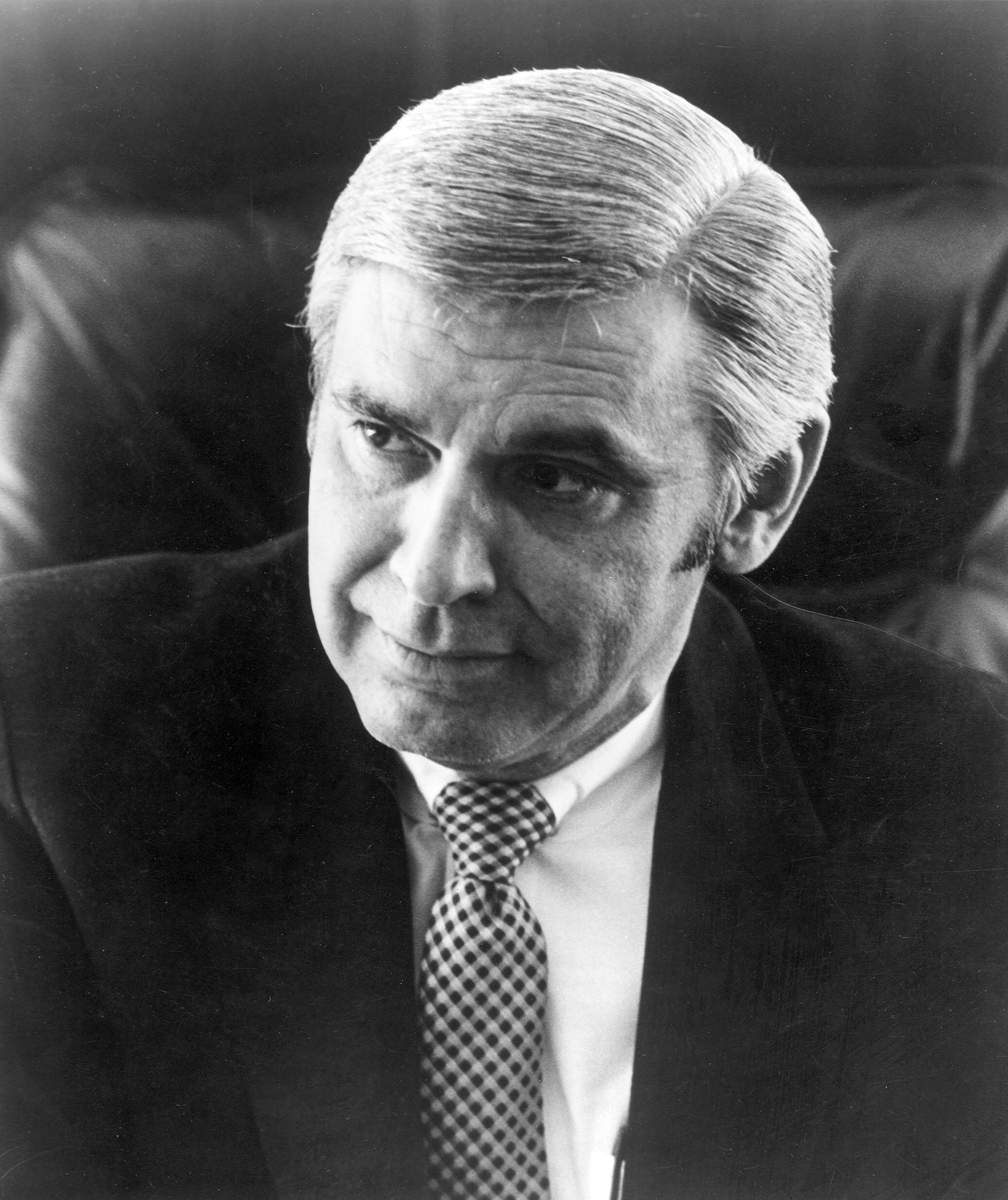
Representative Leo J. Ryan

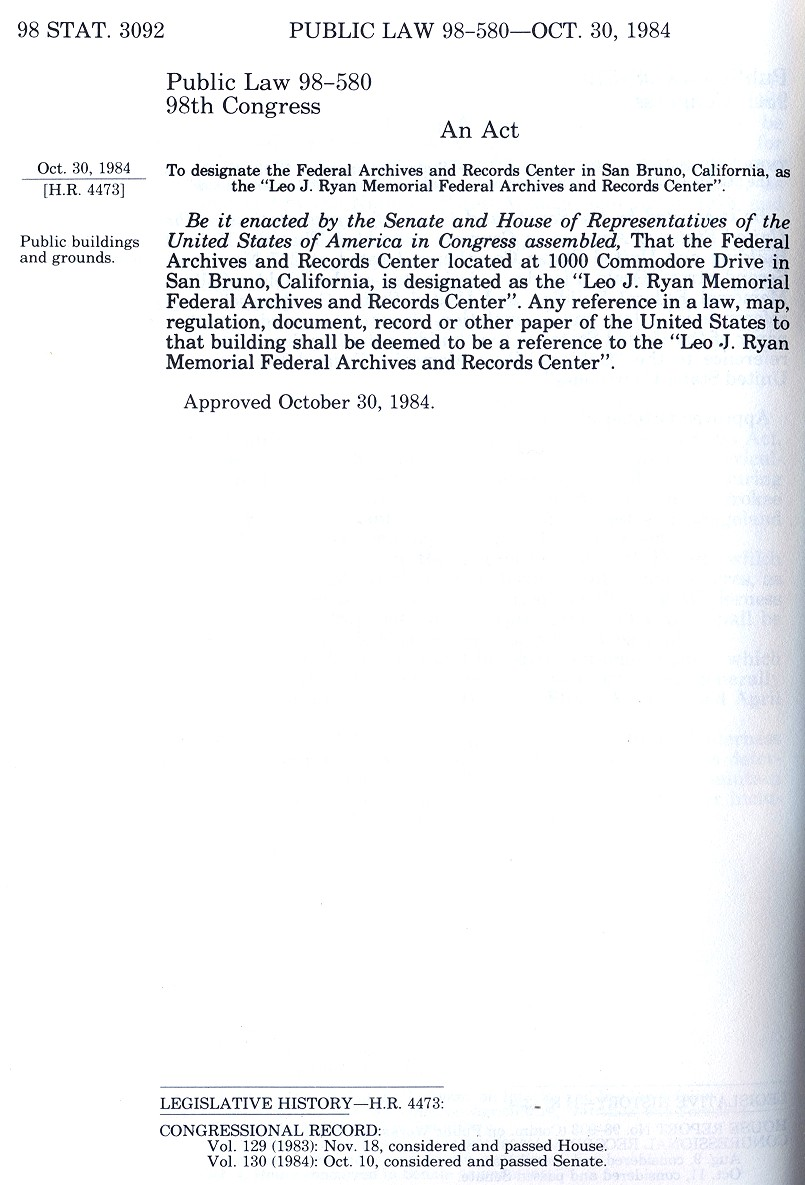
Act naming building as the "Leo J. Ryan Memorial Federal Archives and Records Center", 1984

The building was named in honor and memory of Representative Leo J. Ryan, a United States congressman who was killed by gunfire during a visit to Jonestown. Congressman Ryan was posthumously awarded the Congressional Gold Medal in 1983.

Congressman Tom Lantos introduced a bill in 1983 in the United States Congress: ..to designate the Federal Archives and Records Center in San Bruno, California as the "Leo J. Ryan Memorial Federal Archives and Records Center". The bill passed by unanimous consent in the House of Representatives and Senate, and was signed by President Ronald Reagan and became public law 98-580 on October 30, 1984.

== Specifications ==
The Leo J. Ryan Federal Building is surrounded by a cyclone fence, and functions effectively as a bunker. The building itself is kept isolated - the federal government owns the property behind the building, and no other government tenants are near the facility. After the Oklahoma City bombing, where a federal building was destroyed by explosives, the federal government has taken care to isolate sensitive archived records and documents away from other government agencies. The building houses over 200 million records from 110 different United States federal agencies, as well as 10,000 records from federal courts of the Pacific Sierra region. Records staffers make over 100,000 photocopies per year. It would take 40 people approximately 100 years to microfilm all of the records currently available at the National Archives and Records Administration division of the Leo J. Ryan Federal Building.

As of 1998, the budget for the Pacific Sierra Region of the National Archives and Records Administration was USD$1,000,000 per year, and annual visits to the archives numbered over 15,800. The building is specifically designed for the archiving of government documents - it is isolated, fireproof, and climate-controlled. The temperature within the records rooms is kept at 70 °F (21 °C) and humidity at 50%.

== See also ==
- National Archives facilities
- Federal buildings in the United States
