= Philippine kinship =

System of kinship common in the Philippines

Philippine kinship uses the generational system in kinship terminology to define family. It is one of the most simple classificatory systems of kinship. One's genetic relationship or bloodline is often overridden by the desire to show proper respect that is due in the Philippine culture to age and the nature of the relationship, which are considered more important.

In it, the literal differences are distinguished by generation, age, and in some cases by gender. However, non-Filipinos can be confused by apparently similar relationships being handled verbally differently by the same person, which generally occurs because of the circumstantial relationship or because some authority is represented by the addressee. Other factors that affect how a person is addressed are whether the two are familiar with each other, new to each other's acquaintance, or perhaps involved in a secondary relationship that imparts authority, such as one person being the supervisor of another at work.

Tito is commonly known as 'warrior' in the early 1800s and would be given to sons of soldiers that would enter battle and is a symbolization of death in historical mythology in foreign entities. Simply put, "Kuya" is used to address an older male relative or friend (especially one's own brother), and means "brother". "Ate", is in reference to an older female relative or respected friend (especially one's own sister or kapatid), and means "Sister". All of this respect should be greeted back by younger children or a younger adults with "anak" for children.

As an example, a teenage girl would call her older brother "kuya" and the older "kuya" can answer back with "ate" to level-up or equalize degree of her sister in the family treating her as an equal, the same. She would also tend to call her older male cousin "kuya" also can be answered back to the girl "ate" to equalize the degree of being a family member by his older male cousin. The term kuya is actually likely to be applied to any older male who is within her generation and should be treated with respect, perhaps even the very close friends of her brother. Thus, the terms used are often intended to show the degree of the relationship and the type of relationship, rather than literal biological relationship.

This can be seen in social settings like Facebook, where Filipino teenagers include contemporaries in the "brothers" and "sisters" categories (the equivalent of a "best friend" in U.S. culture).

== Influences on language ==
Over 170 languages are recognized but do not have official status; Tagalog and English are the official languages of the Philippines, and basic English is more effective for communicating with far-flung peoples in the Philippines than any one dialect, including Tagalog. English's prominence is a reflection of the Philippines' close relationship with the United States, especially since World War II, and a testament to the broad reach of television, which broadcasts in a mix of Tagalog and English.

Tagalog is an Austronesian language that has influenced heavily the Philippines' geographical neighbors (other Malayo-Polynesian languages) as well as from Spanish, a legacy of Spain's prolonged colonization. For example, Tagalog has incorporated words like the greeting "Kumusta", from the Spanish "Cómo está".

== Terms based on biological relationships ==
=== Ego's generation ===
| English | Tagalog | Bikol | Cebuano | Waray | Hiligaynon | Ilocano | Kapampangan | Tausug | Ibanag |
|---|---|---|---|---|---|---|---|---|---|
| I | ako | akó | akó | ako | ako | siák, ak | aku | aku | sakan |
| Sibling | kapatid | túgang^{1} | igsúon | bugtó | utod | kabsát^{1} áding^{2} | kapatad | langgud taymanghud | wagi |
| Brother | kapatid na lalaki lalaking kapatid | manoy | igsúon nga laláki | mano | mánong | mánong | aputul kapatad a lalaki | langgung usog | wagi nga lalaki |
| Sister | kapatid na babae babaing kapatid | manay | igsúon nga babáye | mana | mánang | mánang | kaputul kapatad a babai | langgung babai | wagi nga babay |
| Cousin | pinsan (primo/prima) | pínsan | ig-ágaw, ágaw | patúd | pakaisa | kasinsín | pisan | pangtangud | kapitta |
| Male cousin | pinsan na lalaki pinsang lalaki | pínsan | ig-ágaw, ágaw | patúd | pakaisa | kasinsín | pisan a lalaki | pangtangud | kapitta |
| Female cousin | pinsan na babae pinsang babae | pínsan | ig-ágaw, ágaw | patúd | pakaisa | kasinsín | pisan a babai | pangtangud | kapitta |
Notes:^{1} General term for older sibling.^{2} General term for younger sibling.

As a child, one would refer to one's parents as "Ama" or "Tatay" ("Father", in formal and informal Filipino, respectively) and "Ina" or "Nanay" (Mother, in formal and informal Filipino, respectively). One's parents' siblings and their cousins would be called "mga Tiyo" ("uncles"), or "Tiyo" ("uncle") or "mga Tiya" ("aunts") or "Tiya" ("aunt"). One would call one's godparents "Ninong" and "Ninang", meaning godfather and godmother, respectively.

Family friends one generation above, like parent's friends, are called "Tito" (for males) and "Tita" (for females), although they should not be confused with Tiyo and Tiya which are for blood relatives. However, "Tito" and "Tita" are also sometimes used to reference blood relatives as well. Filipinos are very clannish and are known for recognizing relatives up to the 10th or even the 20th degree.

A person's siblings ("mga kapatid") would be one's brothers or sisters. The terms "Kuya" and "Ate" are used to address an older brother and sister respectively as a sign of respect. Any children of their Tiyo (Uncle) or Tiya (Aunt) would be called "mga pinsan" (cousins) so one can either address them as "pinsan" or use the more commonly used "Kuya [cousin's first name]" or "Ate [cousin's first name]" if they are older, or simply address them with their first name or nickname. Their godparents' children are called kinakapatid, which literally means someone made into a sibling. The term "Kuya" is used in Filipino for older brother and "Ate" is used in Filipino for older sister, and those terms are what one also usually uses to refer to or show respect to other people (including cousins and other strangers) who are in the same generation but a little older, or one could use the older term Manong ("big brother") and Manang ("big sister") for much older people that one does not know up to two generations above, unless they are old enough, in which case they should be called Lolo and Lola.

The children of one's "mga kapatid" (siblings) and "mga pinsan" (cousins) would be called "mga pamangkin" (nephews/nieces).

If a person is a "Amang" or "Lolo" ("Grandfather", in formal and informal Filipino, respectively) or "Inang" or "Lola" ( "Grandmother", in formal and informal Filipino, respectively), those called "mga apo" ("grandchildren") would be the offspring, not only of their children ("mga anak") but also the offspring of their children's cousins ("mga pinsan"). Unless a person has a different title (like "Attorney"/"Atty.", "Dr.", "Mayor", etc.) that one is known for, one may also be addressed as "Lolo" or "Lola" by complete strangers or neighbors just by virtue of their age (usually when they are above 60 years old or already considered a senior citizen), as a form of respect.

== Representation ==
The following tree represents the Philippine kinship system, focusing on SECOND UNCLE and YOU.

Philippine kinship

Ninuno 1 Ancestor | Ninuno 2 Ancestor
Lolo; Grandfather | Lola; Grandmother
Tiyo; Uncle | Tiya; Aunt | Ama; Father | Ina; Mother
Hipag; Sister-in-law | Kuya; Elder brother | Ate; Elder sister | Bayaw; Brother-in-law | YOU | Bana/Maybahay/Asawa; Husband/Wife | Toto; Younger brother | Hipag; Sister-in-law | Nene; Younger sister | Bayaw; Brother-in-law
Pamangkin; Nephews/Nieces | Anak; Son/Daughter/Children | Manugang; Son-in-law/ Daughter-in-law
Apo; Grandchild
Apo sa Tuhod; Great grandchild
Apo sa Takong; Great-great grandchild
Apo sa Talampakan; Great-great-great grandchild
Apo sa Great-great-great-great grandchild

== Members of the family ==
| Relation | | English equivalent | |
| Lalaki | Babae | Male | Female |
|---|---|---|---|
| Ninunò | | Ancestor | |
| lolo, ingkong | lola, impo | grandfather | grandmother |
| Magulang | | Parent | |
| amá, tatay, tatang | iná, nanay, inang | father | mother |
| Biyenán | | Parents-in-law | |
| biyenáng lalaki | biyenáng babae | father-in-law | mother-in-law |
| Asawa | | Spouse | |
| esposo, bana | esposa, maybahay | husband | wife |
| Balo | | | |
| biyudo | biyuda | widower | widow |
| Anák | | Child | |
| anák na lalaki, iho | anák na babae, iha | son | daughter |
| Manugang | | Children-in-law | |
| manugang na lalaki | manugang na babae | son-in-law | daughter-in-law |
| Balae | | child in-law's parents | |
| Bilás | | Spouse of one's sibling in-law | |
| Apó | | Grandchild | |
| apong lalaki | apong babae | grandson | granddaughter |
| Kapatíd | | Sibling | |
| kuya, manong (Ilokano) | ate, manang (Ilokano) | elder brother | elder Sister |
| diko | ditse | second older brother | second older sister |
| sangko | sanse | third older brother | third older sister |
| siko | sitse | fourth older brother | fourth older sister |
| Pate, Ading (Ilokano) | | Younger sibling | |
| totò | nenè | younger brother | younger sister |
| Bunso | | Youngest sibling, Baby | |
| siyaho | inso | elder sister's husband | elder brother's wife |
| bayáw | hipag | brother-in-law | sister-in-law |
| Pinsan | | Cousin | |
| tiyo, tiyong, tsong, tito | tiya, tiyang, tsang, tita | uncle | aunt |
| pamangkíng lalaki | pamangkíng babae | nephew | niece |
| kamag-anak | | relatives | |
| ninong | ninang | godfather | godmother |
| kinakapatid na lalaki | kinakapatid na babae | godbrother | godsister |

== Non-literal usage of familiar terms ==
"Kuya" and "Ate" are also titles used to address older male and female cousins (regardless if they are the eldest or not, but older than the cousin addressing them) as a sign of respect. It may also be used for people who are not necessarily relatives but are older. The criteria would be gender (first), age (second), degree of affiliation (third), with actual blood or non-blood relationship being the least important.

"Tiyo" and "Tiya", used literally for uncle and aunt, are often confused with "Tito" and "Tita" which are used in reference to one's parents' close friends. Again, the degree of affiliation in the relationship overrides the literal meaning.

This hierarchy of conditions would be consistently applied to other familial terms that are used for relationship of further distance, such as "Ninang" and "Ninong", which are the honorific titles given to godparents or signing witnesses of either a child's religious christening/dedication or a married couple's marriage officiation.

Filipinos would generally greet each other using their title like: "Kumusta Ate Jhen", or "Kumusta Kuya Jay" and "Kumusta Te Jhen / Kumusta T'Jhen" or "Kumusta Ya Jay / Kumusta Y'Jay" when messaging or writing online; because doing otherwise is considered rude and disrespectful. However, Filipino Quakers, even within their families, address one another by given name regardless of age, in line with their religion's teachings on equality, and conversely, foreign nationals of Filipino descent are or can be addressed in the same manner as they prefer.
