= Organization of the National Archives and Records Administration =

United States government agency

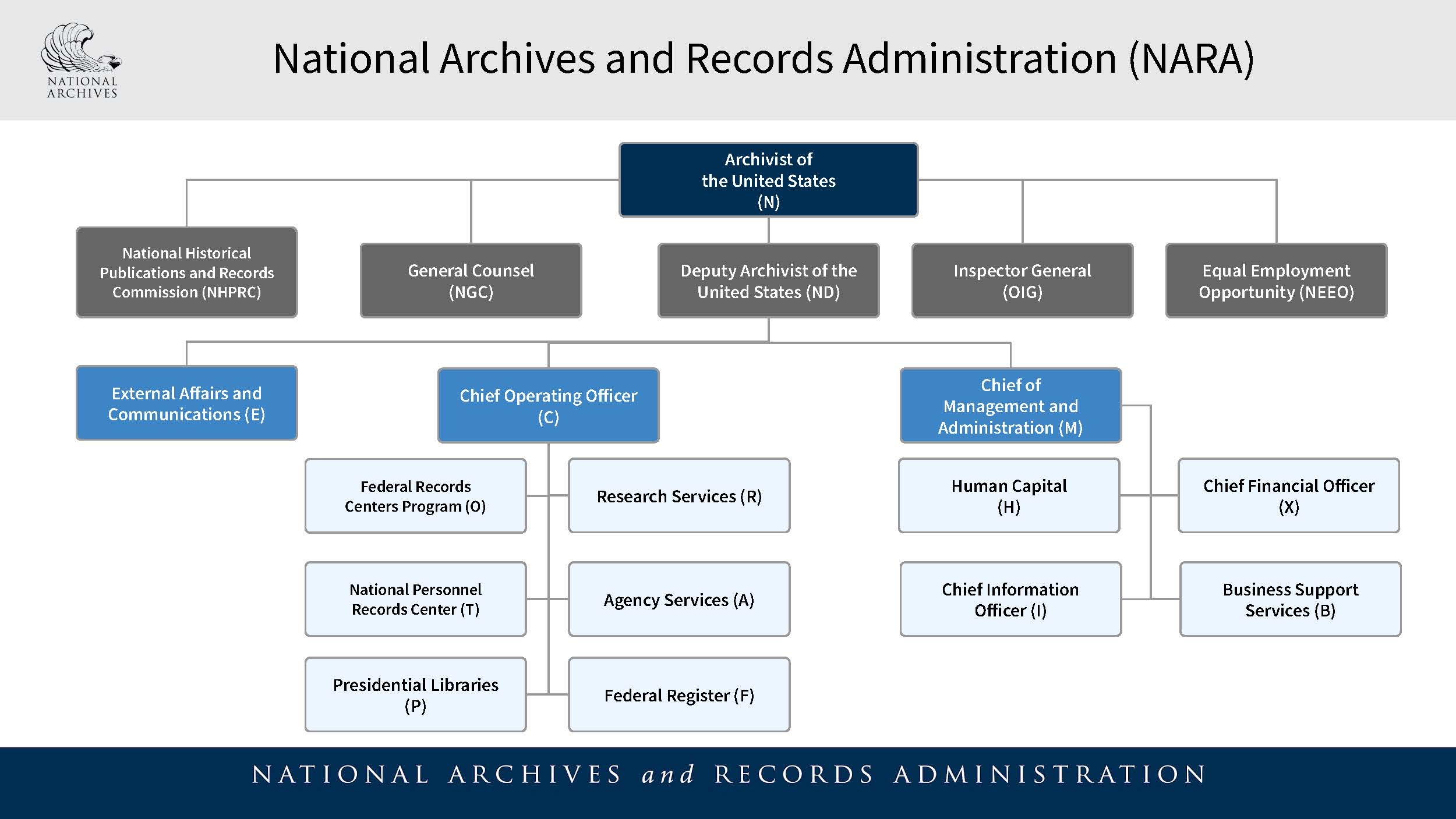
Overview of the NARA Organization after the 2025 reorganization.

The organization of the National Archives and Records Administration refers to the administrative and bureaucratic structure of the National Archives and Records Administration of the United States. The National Archives is considered an independent federal government agency, receiving this status in 1985 after existing under the General Services Administration since the National Archives' founding in 1934.

== Senior leadership ==
The National Archives is overseen by its chief official, the Archivist of the United States who is a political appointee of the President but is not a member of the cabinet. The Archivist of the United States position is currently vacant. The previous Acting Archivist of the United States was Marco Rubio. The Archivist is directly assisted by the Deputy Archivist of the United States who acts a second in command of the National Archives. The deputy archivist position is currently vacant.

Directly reporting to the Archivist of the United States are the chiefs of the three main Archival offices. These are the:

- External Affairs and Communications
- Chief of Management and Administration
- Chief Operating Officer

The National Archives Executive Secretariat is an internal office reporting to the Deputy Archivist. Also reporting to the Archivist of the United States are several independent branches of the National Archives which operate with autonomy concerning their respective areas of expertise. These are the:

- NARA Inspector General
- Office of Equal Employment Opportunity
- National Archives General Counsel

The Archivist of the United States also serves as Chairman of the National Historical Publications and Records Commission.

== National Archives Operations ==
The Chief Operating Officer of the National Archives leads the bulk of the National Archives physical facility operations as well as oversees day-to-day archival activities. This is the highest agency employee directly in charge of National Archives operations who is also the direct superior of the major agency executives. As of 2026, the National Archives Chief Operating Officer is Jay Trainer while the Deputy Chief Operating Officer is Meghan Guthorn.

Under the Chief Operating Officer are three internal offices, concerned with various aspect of National Archives operations, organized as follows:

- Electronic Records Archives Division
- Catalog and Online Access Division
- Records Control and Oversight.

Also reporting to the Chief Operating Officer are six branches of the National Archives:

- Office of the Federal Register
- Agency Services
- Federal Records Center Program
- National Personnel Records Center
- Research Services
- Office of Presidential Libraries.

=== Research services ===
Research services is the most visible face of the National Archives, as it provides archival services to the public. The office is headed by an Executive for Research Services who, as of April 2022, is Chris Naylor. The research services of the National Archives are considered susceptible to a government shutdown, meaning that public access to the National Archives will be closed in such an event. There are three main sub-offices of research services:

- Office of Project Performance and Management
- Office of Preservation Programs
- Office of Research Customer Support
- Office of Digitization Products and Services

Research customer support further oversees the National Archives Library Information Center and serves as a liaison with such affiliated civilian history organizations such as Ancestry.com. The office of preservation programs maintains two branches, one for preservation and conservation efforts at the National Archives Building and the National Archives at College Park, while the second branch is based in St. Louis and deals with preservation of records at the National Personnel Records Center.

==== Access Coordinators ====
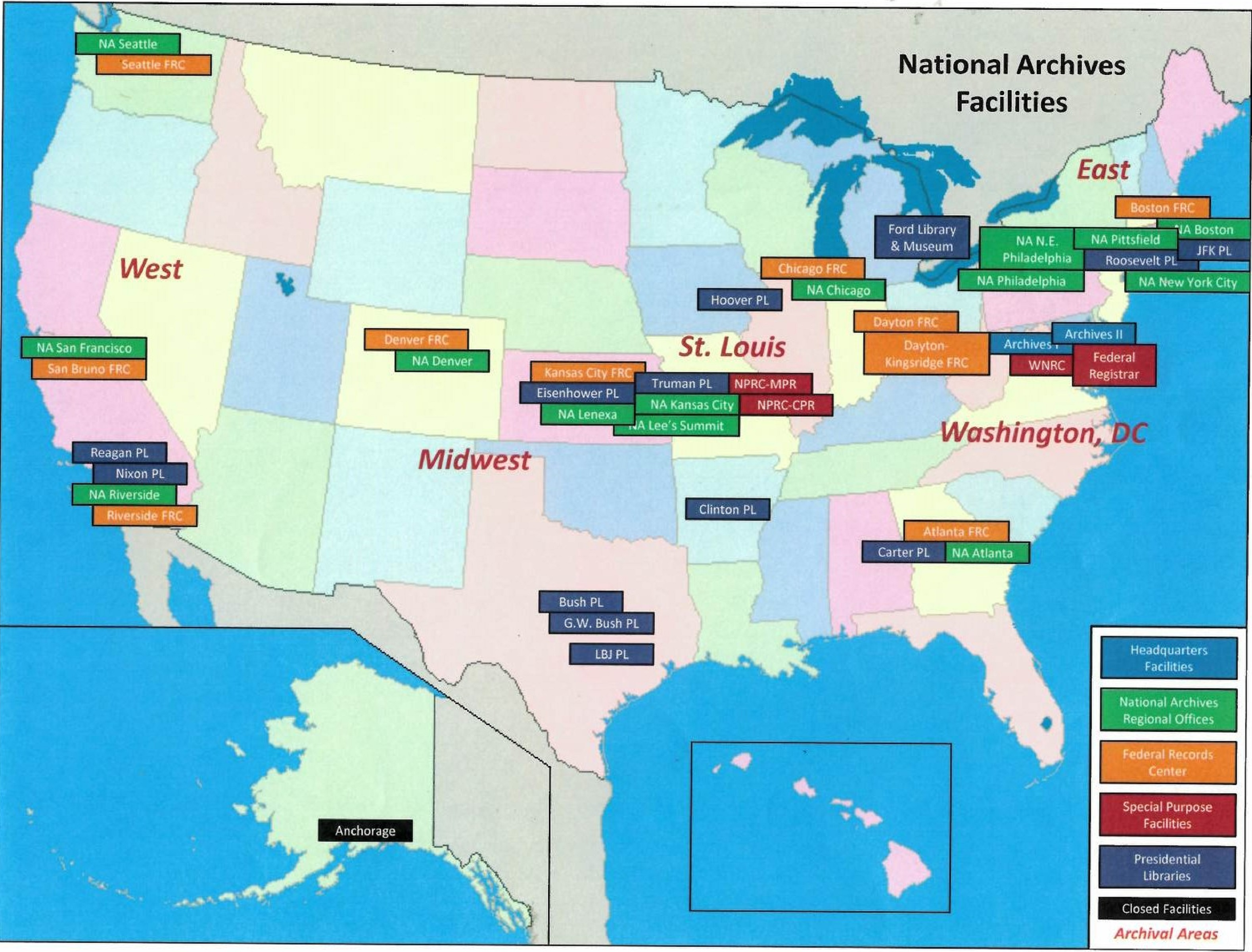
National Archives facilities map showing the various Archival Regions

Access coordinators are the research directors for National Archives services in various geographical regions around the United States and oversee the operations of the NARA Regional Offices. There are presently five National Archives regions, these being:

- Washington DC Region - Headquartered at the National Archives at College Park, oversees research services at both the National Archives Building in Washington and Archives II at College Park.
- St. Louis Region - Headquartered at the National Personnel Records Center in St. Louis
- Region East - Oversees local research offices in Atlanta, New York City, Boston, and Philadelphia
- Region West - Oversees local research offices in Riverside, San Bruno, and Seattle
- Region Midwest - Oversees local research offices in Chicago, Denver, Fort Worth, and Kansas City

Prior to the restructuring of the NARA research services into the current access coordinator system, NARA regions were overseen by Regional Directors as follows:

- Northeast and Southeast Regions: Covered NARA facilities on the east coast of the United States
- Mid-Atlantic Region: Covered records facilities in and around Philadelphia, Pennsylvania
- Great Lakes Region: Covered records facilities in and around Chicago, Illinois
- Rocky Mountain Region: Covered records facilities in and around Denver, Colorado
- Central Plains Region: Covered records facilities in and around Kansas City, Missouri
- Pacific Region: Covered NARA facilities in California
- Pacific Alaska Region: Covered the records facilities in Seattle, Washington and Anchorage, Alaska

=== Agency services ===
The National Archives Agency Services oversees all records requirements and needs internal to the National Archives. Agency services is headed by an Executive who oversees three primary offices, these being the:

- Information Security Oversight Office (ISOO)
- Office of Government Information Service
- National Declassification Center

The Executive for Agency Services as of 2026 is William Fischer. A deputy to the executive, known as the National Archives Chief Records Officer, oversees three additional offices as follows:

- Records Management Operations Office
- Records Management Training Office
- Records Management Oversight and Reporting Office

The Chief Records Officer also oversees the "Permanent Records Capture Team" which, along with the National Archives Appraisal Branch, identify United States government records which are considered critical or vital and should be maintained by the National Archives. Both the capture team and appraisal branch are administratively part of the Records Management Operations Office.

Agency services are funded under a different method than research services, and most of agency services remain open during government shutdowns.

=== Museum services ===
The museum services of the National Archives, fully entitled as the "Legislative Archives, Presidential Libraries, and Museum Services" oversees the Presidential library system and also maintains the "Center for Legislative Archives" which is concerned solely with records of the United States Congress, including the original copies of all constitutional amendments. A special branch known as the "Charters of Freedom" is responsible for the upkeep and storage of the actual United States Constitution and other critical historical documents located in the National Archives Rotunda in Washington, DC.

The museum services branch also creates and oversees all public exhibits of National Archives materials. As of 2018, the acting executive for museum services was Susan K. Donius.

== National Archives Administration ==
The administrative needs of the National Archives are overseen by the Office of Management and Information. The office is headed by the Chief of Management and Administration who oversees five major subordinate offices, each with its own chief officer, as follows:

- Office of Finance
- Office of Acquisition
- Office of Information Services
- Office of Business Support Services
- Office of Human Capitol

A position known as the Senior Procurement Executive is subordinate to the Chief Acquisition Officer in the Office of Acquisition.

=== Financial services ===
All financial matters for the National Archives and Records Administration is overseen by a Chief Financial Officer. The four major financial departments are:

- Office of Budget
- Office of Accounting Policy and Operations
- Office of Financial Reporting and Analysis
- National Archives Trust Fund

Funding for the National Archives and Records Administration is determined as part of the United States federal budget which allocates "non-reimbursable" funds to the National Archives. Reimbursable charges are collected from both government agencies and the public for specific archival services, mostly pertaining to the cost of reproduction and, in some cases, hourly fees for specialized research. Collected service fees are placed into the National Archives Trust Fund.

=== Business services ===
The National Archives Business Support Services Office is concerned primarily with physical maintenance and upkeep of National Archives facilities. The office maintains two administrative branches known as the "Administrative Policy and Planning Division" and the "Storage Coordination and Logistics Office". Two major sub-offices are the "National Archives Security Management Office", concerned with physical security at NARA sites and buildings, and the "Facility and Property Management Office" which oversees repairs, cleaning, and upkeep of facilities. Both of these offices make heavy use of subcontractors to include private custodial companies as well as contracted security guards.

In 2015, the security company contracted to guard the Washington National Records Center, located on the same federal complex as the United States Census Bureau, suffered the death of a guard when a shooter opened fire in the early evening. The death lead to renewed scrutiny on how the National Archives handles security, specifically that many of its buildings are privately guarded and not under the auspices of the Federal Protection Police.

=== Human resources ===
Staffing needs and recruitment are overseen by the Chief of Human Capitol, although the actual advertisement of positions and hiring is conducted through the Office of Personnel Management. The National Archives Human Capitol Office consists of the following major departments.

- Talent Acquisition Office
- Labor Relations and Performance Management Office
- Strategy, Analysis, and Automation Office
- Learning and Organizational Development Office

Non-supervisory employees of the National Archives are represented in an open shop union environment by the American Federation of Government Employees.

=== Information technology ===
All information technology needs are overseen by the Chief Information Services Officer. Major offices of Information Services are as follows:

- Operations Management Office
- Developmental Management Office
- Portfolio Management Office
- Architecture and Technology Management Office
- IT Security Management Office
- Quality Assurance Office

== National Archives Innovation ==
The National Archives Office of Innovation is primarily concerned with improving the public access to government records as well as allowing for better working conditions and equipment to National Archives staff members. The three main branches of the Office of Innovation are the Digitization Branch, Business Standards Branch, and Project Management Branch.

The Office of Innovation is headed by the National Archives Chief innovation Officer who, as of April 2025, was Jill Reilly.
