= Dizon =

Dizon is a Filipino surname derived from the Hokkien Chinese term 二孫 (Pe̍h-ōe-jī: di-sun) which means second grandchild. Notable people with the surname include:

- Allen Dizon (born 1977), Filipino actor
- Charlie Dizon (born 1996), Filipina actress
- José Dizon (died 1897), Filipino revolutionary
- Lilia Dizon (1927–2020), postwar Filipino actress
- Mylene Dizon (born 1976), Filipino actress
- Rolando Ramos Dizon (1944–2012), Filipino politician
- Ryzza Mae Dizon (born 2005), Filipina teen actress and television personality
- Sunshine Dizon (born 1983), Filipino actress
- Vince Dizon (born 1974), Filipino economist, consultant, and political aide
- Rodante Dizon Marcoleta (born 1953), Filipino television host, lawyer, and politician and senator of the Philippines since 2025.
- Edgardo Dizon Pamintuan Sr. (born 1949), Filipino lawyer and politician

== See also ==
- Hispanized Filipino-Chinese surnames
