= William W. Jeffries Memorial Archives =

Archives at the Nimitz Library of the United States Naval Academy

Coordinates: 38°59′5.75″N 76°29′11.1″W

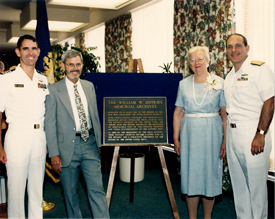
Dedication of the William W. Jeffries Memorial Archives August 12, 1991

The William W. Jeffries Memorial Archives, found at the United States Naval Academy in the Nimitz Library, was named in dedication of William Worthington Jeffries (1914–1989), former professor, archivist, and museum director at the Academy from 1942 to 1989.

Professor William W. Jeffries taught history at the Naval Academy for thirteen years and then served as Senior Professor in the English, History, and Government Department for fifteen years. In 1971 he was selected as the Naval Academy Archivist. Under his leadership, the USNA Archives was integrated into the National Archives and Records Administration (NARA), and in 1985, the Naval Academy Archives became one of the seven NARA affiliated archives. On August 12, 1991, the Naval Academy Archives was officially dedicated as the William W. Jeffries Memorial Archives.

== See also ==
- U.S. Naval Academy Museum
