= Rozzano Locsin =

Filipino nursing academic

Rozzano Locsin, RN, PhD, FAAN
- Born: Rozzano C. Locsin; 1954 (age 71–72); Philippines
- Occupation: Professor of Nursing

Rozzano Locsin is a Filipino-American Professor of Nursing at Tokushima University, and Professor Emeritus at Florida Atlantic University .Locsin is the author of Technological Competency as Caring in Nursing: A Model for Practice. He also edited and co-authored three additional books, including A Contemporary Nursing Practice: The (Un)Bearable Weight of Knowing in Nursing.

== Career ==
Locsin was born in 1954 in Dumaguete, the Philippines. He earned his Bachelor of Science in Nursing from Silliman University in 1976 and his MA in Nursing in 1978. He received his PhD in Nursing from the University of the Philippines in 1988.

In 1991, Locsin joined the Christine E. Lynn College of Nursing at Florida Atlantic University, where he became a tenured Professor of Nursing. He is now a Professor Emeritus. Currently residing in Japan, Locsin serves as a Professor of Nursing at Tokushima University.

== Academic career ==
Through the Fulbright Scholar Award, Locsin developed the first masters program in nursing in Uganda while researching the phenomenon "waiting-to-know" and the lived experiences of persons exposed to patients who died of Ebola. With Mbarara University and the Fulbright Alumni Initiative Award, he established the first community-based University Nursing Education Program.

== Books and chapters ==
- Advancing Technology, Caring, and Nursing, ed. (Auburn House, 2001)
- In 2005, Locsin's book Technological Competency as Caring in Nursing was published by Sigma Theta Tau International Press (a 2017 revised version was published by Silliman University Press, Dumaguete, Philippines). It was translated into Japanese in 2009.
- In 2007 Locsin co-edited the book Technology and Nursing: Practice, Concepts, and Issues, released by Palgrave-Macmillan Co., London, UK,
- In 2009, with Dr. Marguerite Purnell as co-editor, published, A Contemporary Nursing Process: The (Un)Bearable Weight of Knowing in Nursing by Springer Publishing Co.
- Locsin, R. (2016) Technological Competency as Caring in Nursing: A Model for Practice (rev ed). Silliman University Press, Dumaguete, Philippines.
- Locsin, R. Barnard, A., and Locsin, R. (2007) Technology and Nursing Practice. Palgrave Macmillan Co., Ltd. UK.
- Locsin, R. and Kongsuwan, W. (2017). The Evolution of the Theory of Technological Competency as Caring in Nursing. Chanmuang Press, Thailand. (Anticipated distribution: July 2017)
- Tanioka, T., Yasuhara, Y., Osaka, K., Ito, Hirokazu and Locsin, R. (2017). Nursing Robots: Robotic Technology and Human Caring for the Elderly (eds). Fukuro Publishing, Japan. (Anticipated distribution: May, 2017)
