= Sison (surname) =

Sison is a surname found in the Philippines. Notable people with this surname include:

- Jose Maria Sison (1939–2022), founder of the Communist Party of the Philippines in 1968 and the New People's Army guerrilla group in 1969
- Connie Sison (born 1975), Filipina journalist
- Boyet Sison (1963–2022), Filipino journalist and sports commentator
- Frederick Samuel Sison (died 1891) co-owner Pirie Street Brewery in South Australia
- Marco Sison (born 1957), Filipino actor and singer
- Teófilo Sison (1880–1975), Filipino politician
- Riley Sison (2015-present) Filipino soccer player

== See also ==
- Hispanized Filipino-Chinese surnames
