= National Personnel Records Center =

Main repositories of data on U.S. federal employees

The National Personnel Records Center (NPRC) is an agency of the National Archives and Records Administration, created in 1966. It is part of the United States National Archives federal records center system and is divided into two large Federal Records Centers located in St. Louis, Missouri, and Valmeyer, Illinois. The term "National Personnel Records Center" is often used to describe both the physical Military Personnel Records Center facility and as a broader term for all records centers in the St. Louis area. To differentiate, the broader collection is occasionally called the "National Personnel Records Centers".

== Military Personnel Records Center ==
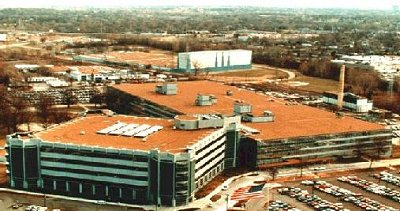
MPRC former location in Overland, Missouri, 1955–2012

The Military Personnel Records Center houses U.S. Armed Forces military service records dating from the late 1800s to the early 2000s.

In 1956, records were moved into the MPRC's new building at 9700 Page Avenue in Overland, Missouri. The building served as the de facto headquarters for the entire National Personnel Records Center, and was often referred to simply as "NPRC" (the building's official code was NPRC-MPR). A fire at the facility burned from July 12–16, 1973, destroying about one-third of its 52 million official military personnel files.

In 2011, the MPRC moved to Spanish Lake, Missouri. The designation "Military Personnel Records Center" was dropped from most official correspondence; the building in Spanish Lake was referred to as the "National Personnel Records Center". The term "National Personnel Records Center" may now refer to both the physical building in Spanish Lake or all of the National Archives federal records complexes located in St. Louis.

== Civilian Personnel Records Center ==
The Civilian Personnel Records Center houses the Official Personnel Folders (OPF) and Employee Medical Folders (EMF) of separated United States federal civilian employees. CPR also houses personnel documents that date back to the mid-nineteenth century, although the bulk of the collection covers the period from 1900 to present. The medical records of military family members treated at Army, Air Force and Coast Guard medical facilities are also stored here.

The Civilian Personnel Records Center was first known as the "St. Louis Federal Records Center" before becoming part of the National Personnel Records Center in 1966. The Civilian Personnel Records Center was located on Winnebago Street in downtown St. Louis, Missouri, and was known as "NPRC-CPR". The facility later shifted locations to Boulder Boulevard in Valmeyer, Illinois and became known as the "NPRC Annex".

== National Archives at St. Louis ==
Housed in the same building as the Military Personnel Records Center (MPRC) is the National Archives at St. Louis which is a regional archives considered part of National Archives research services and separate from the majority of correspondence work handled by the main part of MPRC.

The National Archives at St. Louis is the legal custodian of archived military and civilian personnel records and related personnel data series records. These files are considered open to the public and separate from the military personnel files which are considered protected under the Privacy Act of 1974. Archival records at St. Louis include:

- U.S. Army patient rosters of certain military hospitals
- Selective Service System records from 1940 - 1976
- Army pay cards
- Philippine Army record material
- Navy casualty files, also known as "Individual Deceased Personnel Files" or IDPFs
- Copies of officer order copies
- Military burial files and headstone applications
- German Civilian Personnel files from World War II

=== Preservation St. Louis Office ===
The National Archives at St. Louis maintains an on-site preservation office for the upkeep of locally maintained records, specifically those records which were damaged by the 1973 National Archives fire. The St. Louis facilities maintain several conservation and preservation labs which deal with fire damaged records as well as records affected by age and mold.

== Tenant agencies ==
The National Personnel Records Center presently hosts fourteen tenant agencies of the United States federal government. These include the Department of Veterans Affairs and the FBI, as well as liaison offices with all of the U.S. armed forces with the exception of the United States Coast Guard.

== Directors ==
The director of the National Personnel Records Center is usually a senior federal civil service employee, rated as a GS-14/15 or as a member of the Senior Executive Service. Office of Personnel Management archives list the directorship of NPRC as established in 1966; prior to this time, the two separate records centers for civilian and military personnel records were considered as separate director positions under the General Services Administration. The term "National Personnel Records Center Director" only came into being when the two buildings were administratively (but not physically) merged in 1966.

National Personnel Records Center Directors

- Joseph Wertzberger: 1966–1973
- Warren Griffin: 1973–1979 (Note: Served as director during the National Personnel Records Center fire)
- J. D. Kilgore: 1979–1982
- David Petree: 1982–2000
- Ronald Hindman: 2000–2011
- Scott Levins: 2012–Present (Note: Served as Acting Director (2011–2012) after previously have served as NPRC Assistant Director)
