= 60 Minutes season 3 =

Season of television series

60 Minutes
- Season 3
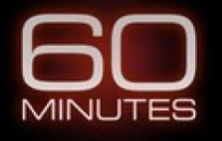
- Logo of 60 Minutes, a CBS news magazine television show broadcast continuously since 1968]
- No. of episodes: 18

Release
- Original network: CBS
- Original release: September 15, 1970 – June 8, 1971

Season chronology
- ← Previous; Season 2 Next → Season 4

60 Minutes's third season, eighteen episodes, from September 15, 1970, to June 8, 1971.

Mike Wallace was a host for the full season. Host Harry Reasoner left the show in December 1970 to co-anchor the ABC Evening News. On the December 8, 1970 show, Morley Safer replaced Reasoner.

== Episodes ==
No. in season	Title	Topic(s)	Original release date	Viewers (millions)
1	"When Porgy Came Home, If Cable TV Comes to Your House, Kurt Vonnegut"	TBA	September 15, 1970	N/A
"When Porgy Came Home " Porgy and Bess in Charleston, North Carolina with scenes from production overlaid with current scenes from the streets featured in the song "Catfish Row"; "If Cable TV Comes to Your House" - interviews with Fred W. Friendly and FCC Chair Dean Burch on prospects for cable TV; Profile of Kurt Vonnegut, writer
2	"Police, William F. Buckley, Fidel Castro"	TBA	September 29, 1970	N/A
"Police" training police officienrs in New Haven, Connecticut on how to handle verbal abuse; "Profile of William F. Buckley"; "Cuba" Films of Fidel Castro speech
3	"Henry Kissinger, Will Rogers, Medgar Evers"	TBA	October 13, 1970	N/A
"Profile of Dr. Henry Kissinger including shots from the Western White House, Nixon's private residence in California and a Presidential visit to Mexico; "Will Rogers' USA" play on Will Rogers portrayed by James Whitmore; Profile of Medgar Evers, civil rights activist who was assassinated in 1963 with recent developments in his case
4	"Leila Khaled, Nuclear China, Detroit small cars"	TBA	October 27, 1970	N/A
Interview with Leila Khaled; "Nuclear China" development in the of nuclear power and weapons in China; "Detroit small cars" - report on American automakers shifting to smaller cars
5	"Charles de Gaulle, Marijuana Farming"	TBA	November 10, 1970	N/A
"Charles de Gaulle" story from two years ago being repeated upon French President's death (Repeat from Nov 12, 1968); "Marijuana Farming" report on marijuana farms in Kansas
6	"Walter Nickel, Cannery Row, George McGovern, Aaron Copland at 70"	TBA	November 24, 1970	N/A
"Interview with Walter J. Nickel", the United States Secretary of the Interior; "Cannery Row"; Interview with George McGovern, Senator for South Dakota; "Aaron Copland at 70" profile of American composer with private party thrown by Leonard Bernstein for 200 friends with a piano duet by host and guest of honor; Commentaries by James J. Kilpatrick and Bill Moyers
7	"Training Sky Marshals, Pierre Trudeau, Denisovich"	TBA	December 8, 1970	N/A
"Training Sky Marshals" - report on training for U. S. Sky Marshals, a counter terrorism group to prevent airline hijackings; Interview with Pierre Elliot Trudeau, Canadian Prime Minister; "One Day in the Life of Ivan Denisovich", film based on novel by Aleksandr Solzhenitsyn
8	"Unsafe Toys, Faces of Jerusalem, Renaissance"	TBA	December 22, 1970	N/A
"Unsafe Toys" report on toy safety and a study of 2,000 dangerous toys; "Faces of Jerusalem"; "Renaissance" drug rehabilitation center in Westport, Connecticut; Commentaries by James J. Kilpatrick and Tom Wicker
9	"Jews in Iron Curtain, Housing, Fellini"	TBA	January 5, 1971	N/A
"Jews in Iron Curtain" treatment of Jews in the Soviet Union and Bucharest, Romania; "A National Scandal" report on problems with mortgage loans administered by Federal Housing Administration with comments by Wright Patman, U. S. Representative from Texas; "Fellini on Fellini" interview of Federico Fellini, film director while making his film The Clowns
10	"Underground Press, Carmelite Nuns, Helen Leavitt"	TBA	January 19, 1971	N/A
"Notes from the Underground" - underground press with Nicholas von Hoffman's critique of story; "Carmelite Nuns " Carmelite Nuns of Santa Clara, California; "Helen Leavitt" Washington, D.C. activist and author of Superhighway-Superhoax, champions use of public funds for mass transportation instead of highways to counteract the Highway lobby
11	"Italian State Dinner, Ron Lyle"	TBA	February 2, 1971	N/A
"Italian State Dinner" President Nixon hosts Prime Minister Emilio Colombo at state dinner for Italy at the White House; "Ron Lyle" American boxer
12	"Crum, Gulf of Tonkin, Emmy Award"	TBA	March 16, 1971	N/A
"How to succeed in the PX business without really trying" - Interview with William J. Crum on PX scandal; "Gulf of Tonkin" Coverage Gulf of Tonkin incident from 1964 which led to the escalation of the Vietnam war; "Emmy Award"
13	"Thievery on the Waterfront, Tobacco Industry, Australian Women"	TBA	March 30, 1971	N/A
"Thievery on the Waterfront" - organized crime at New York City area seaports and airports; "Tobacco industry" Government subsidies to the tobacco industry counter government programs to prevent tobacco use; "Australian Women"
14	"George Scott, My Lay, Run Run Shaw"	TBA	April 13, 1971	N/A
Interview with George Scott where the actor explains to Morley Safer why he plans to refuse the Academy Award for "Patton" if he may win; "My Lay Revisited" Morley Safer visits the village where a massacre by American soldiers took place in March 1968; "Run Run Shaw" Hong Kong filmmaker and business person
15	"Chiang Kai-shek, Heart Health, Ping-Pong Diplomacy"	TBA	April 27, 1971	N/A
Profile of Chiang Kai-shek; "Can You Avoid a Heart Attack?" look into heart Health; "Ping-Pong Diplomacy" report on table tennis improving relationships between People's Republic of China and the United States
16	"LBJ Library, Swiss Banks, Mark-48 Torpedo"	TBA	May 11, 1971	N/A
"LBJ Library" description of newly opened presidential library for Lyndon B. Johnson; "Swiss Banks" report on Banking in Switzerland; "Mark-48 Torpedo" update
17	"John Kerry, Middle East Oil Tankers, Eugene McCarthy"	TBA	May 25, 1971	N/A
Interview with John Kerry; "Tankers and Tycoons" - Middle East Oil Tankers covering Petroleum_transport with oil tankers in the area of Suez Canal; "Profile of Eugene McCarthy"
18	"Immigration to Canada, People We Met"	TBA	June 8, 1971	N/A
"Immigration to Canada"; "People We Met" Review of personal interviews from the current and previous seasons including; 1. Henry Kissinger (October 13, 1970); 2. Walter Nickel (November 24, 1970); 3. James Whitmore (October 13, 1971); 4. Abraham Ribicoff, Jack Bybee, William Crum (March 16, 1971); 5. people on the waterfront (March 30, 1971); 6. Fedrico Fellini (January 5, 1971); 7. Sister Teresa (January 19, 1971); 8. Hughes Rudd (September 15, 1970); 9. Mrs. Lucy Winchester (March 2, 1971); 10. Tricia Nixon (May 26, 1970)

== Ranking ==
The show ranked 101st for the third season with 10.3 million viewers on average.
