= Archie C. Kuntze =

United States Navy captain

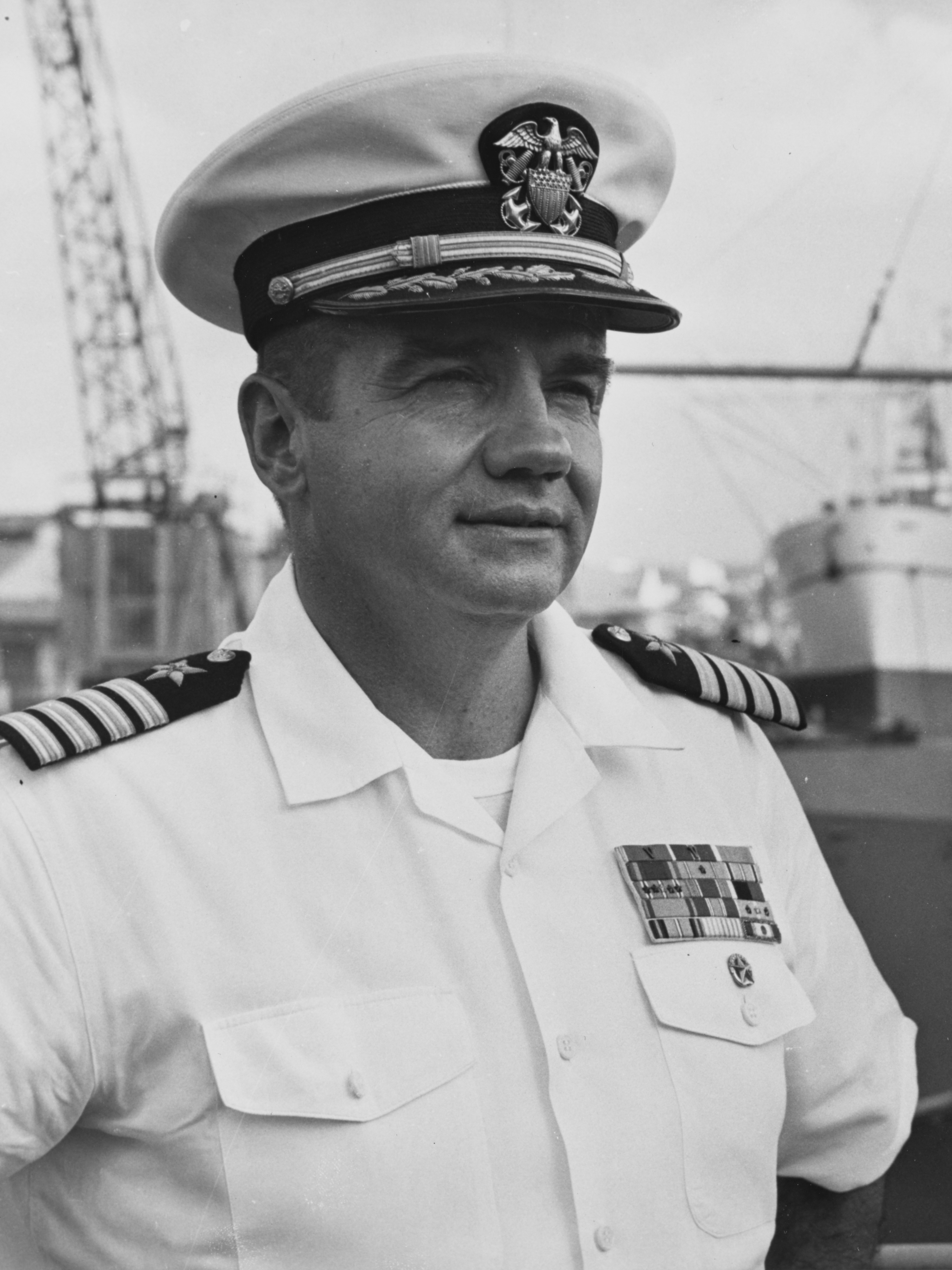
- Kuntze in Saigon in October 1965
- Born: 12 November 1920; Sheboygan, Wisconsin, U.S.
- Died: 14 December 1980 (aged 60); Sheboygan, Wisconsin
- Burial place: Wildwood Cemetery, Sheboygan
- Spouse: Mary Ann Steil Baumann
- Military career
- Allegiance: United States
- Branch: United States Navy
- Service years: 1942–1966
- Rank: Captain
- Nickname: The American Mayor of Saigon
- Commands: Headquarters Support Activity Saigon; Mine Squadron 7 Reserve Escort Division 12; USS Laws; USS Begor
- Conflicts: World War II; Korean War; Vietnam War
- Awards: Purple Heart; Bronze Star with Combat "V"; Legion of Merit with Combat "V"

Archie C. Kuntze (12 November 1920 – 14 December 1980) was a United States Navy Captain who served in conflicts from the 1940s through the 1960s, including as the Commander, Headquarters Support Activity Saigon during the early stages of the Vietnam War. In November 1966 he was court-martialled, but was only convicted of minor offenses which effectively ended his navy career.

== Early life ==
Kuntze was born in Sheboygan, Wisconsin on 27 April 1920. He attended Sheboygan High School, graduating in 1938.

== Military career ==
He entered the United States Naval Academy (USNA) in 1938 as part of the Class of 1942, however his class was graduated early in December 1941 following the Attack on Pearl Harbor. He was assigned to a destroyer and saw action in the Solomon Islands campaign (including the Battle of Savo Island and the Naval Battle of Guadalcanal), the New Georgia campaign and the Bougainville campaign. On 16 April 1945, while serving on USS Harding during the invasion of Okinawa the ship was attacked by four Kamikazes, with one hitting the ship killing 14 crewmen and wounding nine, including Kuntze. Following hospitalization in Hawaii he later rejoined the Harding as second in command.

Kuntze remained in the navy following the end of World War II and with the outbreak of the Korean War he took command of the High-speed transport USS Begor. While under Kuntze's command Begor arrived in the combat zone in December 1950 and spent the next eight months patrolling the Korean coast in support of the United Nations (UN) troops ashore. She served with Underwater Demolition Team (UDT) divers, carrying them to their areas of operations, inserting them, and then retracting them. One of her first missions came on the afternoon of 24 December 1950. Begors embarked UDT No. 3, joined by 11 volunteers from her crew, was the last UN unit to leave Hungnam Harbor after blowing up selected targets in the dock areas during the Hungnam evacuation. In addition to working with American UDT divers, she also occasionally transported British commandos on similar raids and reconnaissance missions behind enemy lines.

Following the Korean War, Kuntze served as an executive officer at the USNA and then as a planning officer in the Amphibious Training Command, United States Pacific Fleet. In October 1957, he was given command of the destroyer USS Laws. On 1 July 1958, Laws was assigned to Reserve Escort Division 12 with Kuntze in command and commenced service as a training ship. In 1959 he was appointed placement officer in the Bureau of Naval Personnel. In November 1962 he was appointed commander of Mine Squadron 7. From 1963 he studied advanced management at Harvard Business School, graduating in early 1964.

In June 1964 he was appointed as commander of Headquarters Support Activity Saigon (HSAS), South Vietnam. In this role he oversaw all logistical and infrastructure operations in Saigon, controlling the ports, hospitals, post exchanges and accommodation for U.S. military personnel with an annual budget in excess of $60 million($462 million in modern dollars) Kuntze became known as "the American Mayor of Saigon" given his absolute control of the supply system which operated separately from Military Assistance Command Vietnam (MACV). His performance in this role put him on the list for promotion to Rear admiral.

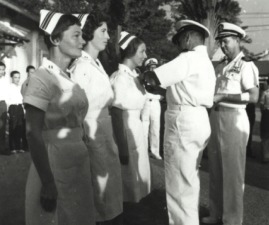
Kuntze decorates navy nurses with the Purple Heart for their injuries in the 1964 Brinks Hotel bombing.

Within months of arriving in Saigon, Kuntze began a relationship with Taiwanese national Jannie Suen (Sun Pei Kiong; Chinese: 孫北江; pinyin: Sūn Běijiāng) who worked at the Taiwanese Embassy. Kuntze divorced his wife and moved with Suen into a villa at 74 Hồng Thập Tự Street. Kuntze and Suen hosted regular parties entertaining senior military and political figures and Suen was driven around Saigon in Kuntze's official navy car. Kuntze featured frequently in the Saigon newspapers, once appearing seven days in a row.

MACV commander General William Westmoreland became increasingly dissatisfied with Kuntze's personal behaviour, a perceived underperformance in meeting MACV requests and the massive loss of U.S. supplies into the South Vietnamese black market. A study released in November 1966 found that up to $1 billion ($7.36 billion in modern dollars), or 40 percent, of U.S. aid to South Vietnam had been lost due to corruption. After petitioning by Westmoreland, in September 1965 Commander in Chief, United States Pacific Fleet, Admiral U. S. Grant Sharp Jr. agreed to transfer common support functions from the navy to the new United States Army 1st Logistical Command.

Kuntze was accused of working with American William J. Crum who operated a crime syndicate across Southeast Asia with extensive interests in the Vietnamese black market, however no link was ever proven. In January 1966 South Vietnamese customs officials seized several bolts of silk which were to be delivered to Suen for use by her father's tailoring business. When Suen was unable to prove that customs duties had been paid she was arrested. At the same time a Naval Board of Inquiry arrived in Saigon to investigate the loss of U.S. supplies and it identified irregularities in Kuntze's bank accounts. Kuntze claimed that the excess funds came from him having sold various items and won sums playing dice. Meanwhile, Suen was released from jail and disappeared. In May he was relieved of command and HSAS was disestablished on 17 May with the final transfer of support functions to the 1st Logistical Command. On 6 July he was assigned to Naval Station Treasure Island, San Francisco.

On 3 August 1966 the Naval Board of Inquiry recommended a court-martial for Kuntze on 18 counts, including conduct unbecoming an officer, illegal currency transactions and making false statements to the Naval Board of Inquiry. His was the first court-martial for misconduct by a navy captain since 1951. The court-martial began at Treasure Island on 3 November, before three Admirals and six Captains. Kuntze filed a motion for the court-martial to be moved to Saigon which was denied. The prosecution attempted to portray Kuntze as having engaged in improper behaviour to finance his love/lust for Suen. Various witnesses gave differing accounts of Kuntze's activities and behaviour, Kuntze denied all the charges, but did not testify, while Suen was unable to be located and so could not be called as a witness, even though she was reportedly living nearby in Nob Hill, San Francisco. Kuntze's former commander in Saigon, retired Rear admiral Jack P. Monroe testified that Kuntze was "brilliant... extremely outspoken...[and] lacking in tact and diplomacy." On 14 November Kuntze was cleared of 15 charges, but found guilty of three charges of "conduct unbecoming an officer" for letting Suen use his government car and living "openly and notoriously in his official quarters" with Suen and of abusing his position by importing silk for Suen's father. He received a reprimand and lost 100 points on the navy promotion list effectively ending his career and he soon resigned from the navy.

== Later life and death ==
Following his retirement from the navy he returned to Sheboygan. He reportedly never saw Suen again and on 12 March 1968 he married Mary Ann Steil Baumann. He later worked as an alderman on the city council from 1970 to 1978.

He died of a heart attack on 14 December 1980 at St. Nicholas Hospital in Sheboygan. He was buried at Wildwood Cemetery in Sheboygan.
