= General Heiser =

General Heiser may refer to:

- Rolland V. Heiser (1925–2016), U.S. Army lieutenant general
- Joseph M. Heiser Jr. (1914–1994), U.S. Army lieutenant general
