= Robert Adamson =

Robert Adamson may refer to:

- Robert Adamson (actor) (born 1985), American actor
- Robert Stephen Adamson (1885–1965), British botanist
- Robert Adamson (FDNY Commissioner) (1871–1935), American journalist and public official
- Robert Adamson (philosopher) (1852–1902), Scottish philosopher
- Robert Adamson (photographer) (1821–1848), Scottish chemist and pioneer in photography
- Robert Adamson (poet) (1943–2022), Australian poet
- Robert Adamson (software developer) (born 1947), American computer scientist
- Robert Adamson (MP) (1753–1817), member of Parliament for Cricklade in England
- Robert E. Adamson Jr. (1920–2004), American naval officer
- Bob Adamson (Robert Wilson Adamson), Australian rugby union player
