= 60 Minutes season 1 =

Season of television series

60 Minutes
- Season 1
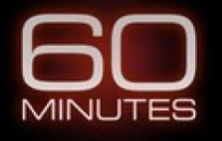
- Logo of 60 Minutes, a CBS news magazine television show broadcast continuously since 1968]
- No. of episodes: 19

Release
- Original network: CBS
- Original release: September 24, 1968 – July 22, 1969

Season chronology
- Next → Season 2

60 Minutes's first season, twenty episodes from September 1968 to April 1969. The two hosts were Harry Reasoner and Mike Wallace.

== Reception ==
The first season ranked 83rd with 12.5 million viewers on average.

== Episodes ==
| No. | Title | Topic(s) | Original release date |
|---|---|---|---|
| 1 | "U.S. Presidential Candidates" | U.S. politics; law enforcement; culture | September 24, 1968 |
Behind-the-scenes look at presidential candidate Richard Nixon and his family in their Miami suite during the summer nomination convention for the GOP party. Hubert Humphrey and his family watching the 1968 Democratic National Convention, report by Mike Wallace; Viewpoints introduce regular feature with guest opinion columnists. Interviews of three European public intellectuals about the elections included: Malcolm Muggeridge, Peter von Zahn and Luigi Barzini Jr.; "Cops" relationship between Americans and law enforcement officials with an interview of U.S. Attorney General Ramsey Clark, report by Mike Wallace.; Why Man Creates short film by Saul Bass (Excerpts)
| 2 | "Richard Nixon Interview" | US defense; US politics; sports | October 8, 1968 |
Examined U.S. Defense research into germ and gas warfare. (First of two parts); "Red, White and Maddox" - profile of Lester Maddox, Georgia governor; Profile of Graham Hill, Formula One driver; Interview with Richard Nixon the Republican Party candidate for president.; Commentary by Art Buchwald.
| 3 | "Hubert H. Humphrey Interview" | U.S. politics; U.S. defense; lifestyle | October 22, 1968 |
Interview Hubert Humphrey, Vice President and Democratic Presidential Candidate, during the summer nomination convention for Democratic party; Interview George Wallace, Independent Presidential Candidate; Second part of an investigative story on U.S. germ and gas warfare research; Jacqueline Kennedy to Aristotle Onassis marriage
| 4 | "Richard Nixon campaign/Joe Namath/invasion of Czechoslovakia/Percy Foreman" | U.S. politics; sport; French politics | November 12, 1968 |
Review previous week's election of Richard Nixon for President; Video footage of the Soviet invasion of Czechoslovakia filmed during Prague Spring with Kamil Winter, Czech journalist; Report on French President Charles de Gaulle with commentary by Jean-Jacques Servan-Schreiber; Profile of NFL football star Joe Namath quarterback of the New York Jets. Commentary by Dick Schaap.; Profile of Percy Foreman, defense attorney in Texas.
| 5 | "Jacqueline Grennan/Laurent Restaurant/Edmund Muskie" | U.S. politics; religion; food | November 26, 1968 |
Interview of Edmund Muskie, re-elected Senator; Interview Jacqueline Grennan, former nun and president of Webster College. Grennan left the Roman Catholic Church challenging its stance on birth control.; Visit the Laurant restaurant in New York City with Craig Claiborne, food critic for The New York Times. Reporting by Morley Safer.
| 6 | "W. Averell Harriman/Prison Assaults/Dirty Football/Shoplifting/Adam Smith" | Incarceration in the United States; U.S. politics; sport; international finance | December 10, 1968 |
Interview with W. Averell Harriman, former Ambassador to the United Kingdom and Soviet Union, reported by Charles Collingwood; Report on homosexual assaults in American prisons with Philadelphia District Attorney Arlen Spector, who discusses the results of an investigation into the problem.; "Dirty Football" - cheating in the National Football League; "Shoplifting"; "The international Money Game"
| 7 | "Family of Martin Luther King, Jr./Ethel Kennedy/Jesus Christ" | U.S. civil rights; education; U.S. politics; religion | December 24, 1968 |
Interviews of Coretta Scott King, Bernice King, Dexter King, Yolanda King, family of the late activist Martin Luther King, Jr. during Christmas in Atlanta, Georgia; Report on illiteracy in the U.S.; Interview with Ethel Kennedy the widow of the late Senator Robert F. Kennedy.; Essay by Andy Rooney on "What Jesus Christ looked like?"
| 8 | "Review 1968/Spiro Agnew/Smothers Brothers/Otto Skorzeny" | international events; U.S. politics; entertainment | January 7, 1969 |
"The World of '68" - film montage directed by Chuck Braverman Stills and films offer a review of the news events of the past year.; Interview with Vice President-elect Spiro Agnew by Mike Wallace; Profile of the Smothers Brothers comedy duo, interview by Harry Reasoner including films taken while their The Smothers Brothers Comedy Hour was produced. Review of comics Dan Rowan and Dick Martin.; "The Most Dangerous Man in Europe" - Former Nazi SS colonel Otto Skorzeny relates how he headed the team that spirited Mussolini out of Italy to Germany in September 1943. Interviewed by Robert Trout.
| 9 | "Middle East tensions/American whiskey/Enzymes" | Middle East; lifestyle | January 21, 1969 |
Report on Middle East tensions between Israel and regional Arab neighbors, filmed in Israel and Lebanon.; "Essay on Whiskey" - how whiskey is made and consumed in America; "Enzymes"
| 10 | "Duke and Duchess of Windsor/Airline Hijacking/Eric Hoffer" | U.K. royalty; travel safety; U.S. crime | February 4, 1969 |
"Cottage for Sale" - Interview with the Duke and Duchess of Windsor with a tour of their country home outside Paris which is for sale.; "Hijacking" - Report on the current wave of airline hijackings with interview of Assistant Attorney General Will R. Wilson, John Fitzgerald, coordinator of Cuban affairs Division of State Department and Oscar Bakke, associate administrator for aviation safety for the FAA.; "Viewpoint" Reactions to the CBS News Special "The Savage Heart: A Conversation with Eric Hoffer" from Jan. 28, 1969. Opinions by Grover Cleveland Hall, Marya Mannes, William F. Buckley, Jr., and Roy Innis; ""Why People Murder" - Houston Police Department homicide division on murder statistics and causes of murders; Andy Rooney comments on female fashion designs and the mini-skirt.
| 11 | "Welfare/Skiing/Danny the Red/NYC Snow" | U.S. government; lifestyle; weather | February 18, 1969 |
The Welfare Mess: Country Style"; "The Billion Dollar Ski Boom" - CBS Sports commentator Heywood Hale Broun examines the surging popularity of skiing in the U.S. and on the large expense needed to finance the hobby.; "Daniel Cohn-Bendit" - interview conducted in Frankfurt, with 23-year-old German student activist "Danny the Red" Cohn-Bendit, who discusses the French student revolt of 1968, his personal philosophy and his candid opinions on LBJ, President Nixon, Martin Luther King and Karl Marx. Interview by Mike Wallace.; Report on heavy snowstorms in New York City of February 1969.
| 12 | "Fillmore/Presidential press conference/Pearl Harbor" | entertainment; U.S. politics; Japan-US relations | March 4, 1969 |
"Carnegie Hall for the Hip" - Report on The Fillmore rock auditorium in San Francisco.; "An Essay on Ugly."; Analysis of President Nixon's recent news conference.; Report on a group of Japanese who toured Pearl Harbor.
| 13 | "Welfare/Palm Beach/John Mitchell/Baseball" | U.S. government; lifestyle; U.S. defense; sport | March 18, 1969 |
"Welfare in the City"; "Palm Beach with Charlotte Curtis."; Profile of Atty. Gen John Mitchell.; Report on an old-timers' baseball game
| 14 | "H.L. Hunt/Post-war German children/Heroin addiction" | TBA | April 1, 1969 |
"The Richest Man in the World?" - Interview with multi-billionaire H. L. Hunt, who discusses his conservative ideas on politics and women, philanthropy, and why he feels that Calvin Coolidge was the last great U.S. President ("Money Talks"); "The Heroin Epidemic" Report on heroin addiction in the U.S.; "Black, German AND Illegitimate" - Report on fatherless German war babies; Reflections on the death of Dwight D. Eisenhower
| 15 | "Alice Roosevelt Longworth/Why Man Creates/Negative income tax/Nudity in Arts" | TBA | April 22, 1969 |
Interview with Alice Roosevelt Longworth, daughter of Theodore Roosevelt.; "Why Man Creates" - Saul Bass's animated film on the development of human creativity.; "Negative Income Tax"; "Nudity in the Arts"
| 16 | "Tora, Tora, Tora/The CLIO Awards" | TBA | May 13, 1969 |
"Tora Tora, Tora " - the war film Tora! Tora! Tora! sparks controversy with Hollywood's use of armed forces men and equipment for movie productions including the Navy ship USS Yorktown and nine other ships during the Vietnam War. The Navy request was initially denied by Phil G. Goulding, Assistant to the Secretary of Defense for Public Affairs; "The Clio Awards" - Highlights from the annual awards presentation which honors the past year's best commercials, with excerpts from nominated ads.; Report on American draft resisters who have found a refuge in Canada, focusing on four young men now living in Ontario; in interviews, they discuss the reasons why they left the U.S., their feelings on Vietnam and American politics, and their new way of life; also interviewed is a University of Waterloo professor who aids draft resisters and military deserters in adjusting to their new lives.
| 17 | "Africa war/Vaccine for German Measles/Fiddler on the Roof" | TBA | June 10, 1969 |
Report on the war between Biafra and Nigeria, featuring a look into the causes and possible solutions to the conflict. Included are interviews with political and military leaders from both nations, among them Biafra's Gen. Philip Effiong.; Report on a vaccine for German measles.; Films of a production of Fiddler on the Roof performed by Black and Puerto Rican young people in New York City.
| 18 | "The Death of Venice/American Detention Camps/Tito/Hair" | TBA | June 24, 1969 |
"The Death of Venice" - Examination of the beautiful Italian city's plight as it sinks into the sea.; "American Detention Camps" - Report on the establishment of various detention centers in the U.S. and on the associated controversy; Interview with Yugoslavia's Marshal Tito, focusing on how response to youths' cries for more freedom of expression. Interviewer by Sir Fitzroy MacLean British journalist and former British liaison officer to Tito's World War II partisans.; Excerpts of Hair, the musical from a Yugoslavian production at Atelje 212 in Belgrade.
| 19 | "Youth Rebellion / German Gas Warfare" | TBA | July 8, 1969 |
Harry Reasoner and Stuart Reasoner, his son, discuss the youth rebellion and generation gap. Topics included the seriousness with which young people approach the world's problems and the Establishment's attitudes and systems concerning morality and ethics. From a conversation telecast on Philadelphia's WCAU-TV station.; "German Gas Warfare" - U.S. efforts to develop a chemical weapons with risks compared to nuclear weapons. Rebroadcast of two-part segments from October 8th and 22nd, 1968.; Season finale

== Post-season episode ==
The final episode of the first season was three re-broadcast segments.

| No. | Title | Topic(s) | Original release date |
|---|---|---|---|
| . | "Duke and Duchess of Windsor/Money Talks/Whiskey" | TBA | July 22, 1969 |
Rebroadcast of three segments: Interview with the Duke and Duchess of Windsor (Repeat S01E11 from February 4, 1969); "Money Talks" - Interview with H.L. Hunt (Repeat S01E15 from April 1, 1969); "Essay on Whiskey" (Repeat S01E10 from January 21, 1969)
