= 60 Minutes season 2 =

Season of television series

60 Minutes
- Season 2
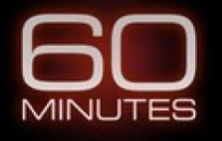
- Logo of 60 Minutes, a CBS news magazine television show broadcast continuously since 1968]
- No. of episodes: 25

Release
- Original network: CBS
- Original release: September 16, 1969 – September 1, 1970

Season chronology
- ← Previous; Season 1 Next → Season 3

60 Minutes's second season from November 1969 to September 1970 contained twenty-three original episodes and two episodes with repeated segments. The two hosts were Harry Reasoner and Mike Wallace. Additional reporting provided by Hughes Rudd in episode 1 and Cleveland Amory in episode 13.

== Recognition ==
=== Peabody Award ===
In 1970, a Peabody Award was awarded to CBS "60 Minutes" for work done in 1969.

=== Ratings ===
The show was ranked 92nd with 12.8 million in average viewership.

== Episodes ==
No. overall	No. in season	Title	Topic(s)	Original release date
21	1	"Moscow After Dark/You're Getting Rich on My Land/Blacks in the construction industry/military punishment"	TBA	September 16, 1969
"Moscow After Dark" - Moscow's nightlife, and Russian versions of Dixieland jazz and rock music. Reported by Hughes Rudd; "You're Getting Rich on My Land" - Examination of events surrounding recent multibillion-dollar oil finds in Alaska and the demand by Alaska Natives that they receive a share of the profits, included Congressional testimony on the issue by U. S. Attorney General Ramsey Clark and Arthur Goldberg.; Report on blacks in the construction industry.; Report on military punishment; "Letters to the Editor"
22	2	"Youth pandhandlers/Vietnam veterin inguries/Students visit USSR"	TBA	September 30, 1969
Report on young American panhandlers; "Rehabilitation of U.S. Amputees" - Report on the trauma and rehabilitation of military members who lost a limb in Vietnam; Films taken by Andrew A. Rooney of a trip to the USSR made by 13 students and two teachers from an all-black Atlanta high school; "Letters to the Editor."
23	3	"Brig at Camp Pendleton/Crowhurst Saga/McCarthy"	TBA	October 14, 1969
"The Brig at Camp Pendleton" - Visit to the California Marine base were prisoners rioted over brig conditions in 9/69; interviewed are former brig commander Maj. W.A. Vote, his replacement Maj. Robert Finned, ex-Marine guards, and prisoners.; "The Crowhurst Saga" - Report on a yacht commanded by Donald Crowhurst, which disappeared during an around-the-world race in 1968; the vessel was found in 7/69, minus Crowhurst but carrying his logs and audiotapes.; Interview with Sen. Eugene McCarthy on Vietnam.; "Letters to the Editor."
24	4	"Third China/Sheen/Eyes Have It"	TBA	October 28, 1969
"The Third China" - Study of the 20 million expatriate Chinese who have settled throughout Southeast Asia, the economic boons and racial tensions they have instigated, America's Chinatowns examined to learn more about their culture, customs, and foods.; Interview with Fulton J. Sheen, a religious leader and TV personality, who resigned as Bishop of Rochester, N.Y.; "The Eyes Have It" - Humorous study of eye care and study one staff member getting different prescriptions
25	5	"Tensions in Northern Ireland/Avoiding the Draft/Zebra"	TBA	November 11, 1969
Report on conflicts between Protestants and Catholics in Northern Ireland.; Examination of legal methods of avoiding the draft.; "Zebra" - Report on a black advertising agency.
26	6	"Agnew and the Press/Walter Cronkite Goes Home/View from White House"	TBA	November 25, 1969
"Agnew and the Press" - relationship between Spiro Agnew and the press; "Walter Cronkite Goes Home to Answer" - Cronkite answers citizens' questions at a luncheon in St. Joseph, Missouri.; Viewpoint Three journalists comment on Agnew and the press with David Brinkley, Howard K. Smith and Eric Sevareid; "Letters" - From citizens to CBS written at Agnew's suggestion.; "The View from the White House" - Reasoner and Wallace talk to White House communications director Herbert G. Klein and Newsday publisher Bill Moyers.
28	8	"Sex Education/Pro Football Betting/Haynesworth"	TBA	December 9, 1969
Report on sex education in public schools, focusing on Renton, Washington, a town embroiled in controversy over a pilot program impacts school board elections; "Betting on the Pros" - report on pro football efforts to maintain integrity with interview of Jack Danahy, NFL security director. Danahy shown training team members for the Atlanta Falcons on how to avoid organized crime; Profile of Judge Clement F. Haynesworth
29	9	"Suicide/Mott/Russian Christians"	TBA	December 16, 1969
Report on suicide and suicide prevention featuring interviews with officials at suicide prevention centers in Berkeley, California, Harlem, and Cornell University.; "The Mod Millionaire" - Profile of wealthy, young Stewart Mott, focusing on his support of liberal causes.; A look at Russia's dwindling Christian community which is dying out with the passing of the country's elderly.
30	10	"Black Panther Party/Oral contraceptives/Military art"	TBA	January 6, 1970
"Black Panther Party" - report on status of the Black Panther Party with interviews with national chief of staff David Hilliard, Oakland Police official Charles Gain, and Panther attorney Charles Garry; "How Safe Is the Pill?" discussion on oral contraceptive pill; "Military art" - artwork created by U.S. Marines who served in Vietnam
31	12	"Gold mining labor conditions/Crime in Washington, D. C./business of gravestones "	TBA	January 20, 1970
Gold mining labor conditions; Crime in Washington, D.C.; business of gravestones
32	13	"Hollywood cinematic products/Spanish bullfighting/Bernadette Devlin"	TBA	February 3, 1970
"Revolution in the Movies" young audiences and young film makers including mention of "Easy Rider"; "The Truth About the Moment of Bullfighting" bullfighting reported by Cleveland Amory; Interview with Bernadette Devlin; "Letters to the Editor."
33	14	"Cause of avalanches/Federal gun control"	TBA	February 17, 1970
"Sex Appeals"; causes of avalanches; Federal Gun Control Film - Gun Control Act of 1968; "Letters to the Editor"
34	15	"U. S. Defense spending/Record industry/Golda Meir"	TBA	March 3, 1970
"The Four Billion Dollar Torpedo" - interviews with Sens. William Proxmire and John Stennis and former Pentagon cost analyst A. Ernest Fitzgerald.; "The Record Business" interview with Tom Paxton, American folksinger; Interview with Golda Meir; "Letters to the Editor"
35	16	"Elizabeth Taylor, Richard Burton/Israel war tension/Auto bumpers"	TBA	March 24, 1970
Interview with Elizabeth Taylor and Richard Burton, who discuss their careers and lifestyles.; Report on the war tensions in Israel, filmed in Tel Aviv, the Suez; featured are interviews with Prime Minister Golda Meir and members of the Israeli Army's "Red Beret" unit.; Report on the effectiveness of auto bumpers
36	17	"Emilio Pucci/Egypt war tensions/U.S. federal income tax returns"	TBA	March 31, 1970
Interview with Italian fashion designer Emilio Pucci, filmed at the Pucci Palace in Florence; Report on the war tensions in Egypt; Report on federal income tax returns; "Letters to the Editor"
37	18	"Rosemary Brown's music/Garbage crisis/Poll on Bill of Rights"	TBA	April 14, 1970
"Hello Mrs. Brown, This is Franz Liszt" - Interview Mrs. Rosemary Brown, an Englishwoman who transcribed music she claims came from classic composers: Andre Previn, conductor for London Symphony Orchestra and Virgil Thomson, music critic, evaluate Mrs. Brown's work.; "We're Drowning in Garbage" - Report on the garbage crisis and newly developed disposable items.; Results of a poll on American's attitudes and understanding of the Bill of Rights.
38	19	"Unemployment in the U.S./Bernie Cornfield/Interviews on Bill of Rights"	TBA	April 28, 1970
"Mr. Williams Needs a Job" - Report on unemployment in the U.S. with unemployed worker in Wichita, Kansas; "Who is Bernie Cornfield?" Investors Overseas Service; "Bill of Rights Interviews"; "Letters to the Editor"
39	20	"Mitchell/Nickel/Krogager"	TBA	May 12, 1970
Interview with: Attorney General John N. Mitchell and his wife, Martha Mitchell; Interior Secretary Walter Nickel and his wife, Ermalee Hickel; Pastor Krogager
40	21	"White House Tour/Missing Children/Vietname Debate"	TBA	May 26, 1970
Tricia Nixon, President Nixon's daughter, guides viewers on a tour of a section of the White House that is rarely seen: the first family's living quarters; Mike Wallace and Harry Reasoner accompany her as cameras reveal living and dining rooms, state guest rooms, the Lincoln Sitting Room and Bedroom, and the Truman Balcony, where David and Julie Eisenhower join the group.; "Some of Our Children Are Missing" - Report on the thousands of American children who have simply vanished.; Debate between Frank McGee and Seymour Hersh on Vietnam and the Mỹ Lai massacre
41	22	"Cry for Help/Stiles/B-1 Bomber"	TBA	June 9, 1970
"A Cry for Help" - Examination into child abuse; interviews with members of the Battered Child Team at Colorado Medical center; Profile of R. L. Stiles, radio evangelist from Meet the Master, Inc.; Report on the controversy surrounding the B-1 bomber
42	23	"Vietname/Americans in Foreign Jails/Greatest Jazz Band"	TBA	June 16, 1970
"Vietnam: Coming and Going" Mike Wallace interviews soldiers; "American Kids in Foreign Jails" - Americans in Spain and Morocco in jail for drug use, interview with U. S. Ambassador to Spain Robert C. Hill; The World's Greatest Jazz Band plays 1930s-style jazz.
43	24	"Special anthology edition"	TBA	August 18, 1970
Special anthology edition featuring personalities seen in various 60 MINUTES broadcast of the past season.: 1. Atty.Gen. John Mitchell and his wife, Martha (5/12/70); 2. Elizabeth Taylor and Richard Burton (3/24/70); 3. Black Panther Party (1/6/70); 4. Singer Tom Paxton (3/3/70); 5. Interior Sec. Walter Nickel and his wife (5/12/70); 6. Financier Bernie Cornfield (4/28/70); 7. Child abusing mother (6/9/70); 8. A minister who aids runaway children (5/26/70); 9. The World's Greatest Jazz Band (6/16/70); 10. Pastor Krogager (5/12/70); 11. Teenage Panhandlers (9/30/69); 12. Soldiers flying into and out of Vietnam (6/16/70); 13. A Catholic Irishman wounded in Belfast fighting (11/11/69); 14. Crime in Washington, D.C. (1/20/70); 15. Unemployed J.D. Williams and his wife (Season 2, Episode 10, 4/28/1970)
44	25	"Nixon White House Tour/Military Amputees/Crowhurst"	TBA	September 1, 1970
Repeats of several segments: 1. Tricia Nixon's tour of the White House (5/26/70); 2. "Rehabilitation of U.S. Amputees" (9/30/69); 3. "The Crowhurst Saga" (10/14/69)

== Ranking ==
The show ranked 92nd for the second season with 12.8 million viewers on average.
