= Ejlif Krogager =

Ejlif Egon Richard Søndergaard Krogager (5 February 1910 – 7 January 1992) was a Danish pastor and entrepreneur, who founded the travel agency Nordisk Bustrafik in 1951 which evolved into the multi-national company Tjæreborg Rejser.

During the Second World War he was active in the Danish resistance movement.

== Business career ==
After the war, Krogager entered the tourism business by founding Nordisk Bustrafik in 1951, offering affordable bus trips for Danish tourists. The business developed into Tjæreborg Rejser, which started a German subsidiary in 1973, becoming the fourth largest travel agency in that country within 3 years. In 1962 he and Jørgen Størling founded Sterling Airways, which offered charter flights from Billund.

On the Spanish island of Lanzarote, Krogager bought an existing but unfinished development in 1978 for its housing capacity. But together with Danish cycling champion Willy Beckmann he developed the idea of a resort for active holidays. The resort opened, as one of few on Lanzarote at the time, on 22 June 1983 as Club La Santa offering sports facilities for active holiday goers.

In 1988 Sterling Airways was bought out of Tjæreborg Group. Tjæreborg Rejser was sold to Janni Spies, owner of Danish travel agency Spies, on 3 January 1989. The German subsidiary had already been sold eight years before. Club La Santa, however, was not part of these transactions and is still controlled and operated by the Krogager family.

== In the Media ==
Krogager was interviewed by 60 Minutes for the broadcast on May 12, 1970.
