= William J. Crum =

American black marketeer (1918–1977)

- William J. Crum in Hong Kong in 1971
- Born: 24 June 1918; Shanghai, China
- Died: 5 February 1977 (aged 58); Hong Kong
- Other name: The money king of Vietnam
- Known for: Black market activities in South Korea and South Vietnam

William John Crum (24 June 1918 – 5 February 1977) was an American businessman who was involved in black market operations in South Korea and South Vietnam and became known as the “money king of Vietnam.” He was a key figure in the United States Senate investigation in 1971 into fraud and corruption in the management of military club systems known as the PX Scandal.

== Early life ==
He was born in Shanghai, China on 24 June 1918 to American parents. His father was a navigator on the Yangtze River, while his mother was born in Hyfang, China. His younger brother, Whitney I. Crum was born in Shanghai in 1922. In 1935 his family moved to the United States and he attended Beverly Hills High School and the San Rafael Military Academy.

== Business ==
After working odd jobs, Crum joined the Merchant Marine and returned to the Orient. In 1946 he was a freight solicitor for American President Lines in Shanghai, but was reportedly fired for dealing in U.S. currency in the black market. He later operated a radio station, XMHA in Shanghai and was married to his second wife, Russian Tantina Antonia Andrews.

In 1950 Crum moved to Japan and then South Korea where he sold liquor and other supplies to the United States Army open mess systems and Post Exchange (PX) through his company Tradewell Co. By 1954 Tradewell was an established business selling beer, liquor, snacks, slot machines, jukeboxes, electrical appliances, building materials and vehicles to nonappropriated fund 8th Army activities. After Whitney Crum graduated from the University of Southern California in 1954, he established a company called Tradewell Co. in Los Angeles which filled his brother's orders for military clubs in South Korea.

Crum's modus operandi involved providing lavish entertainment and gifts for local and U.S. civilian and military officials who could provide influence or protection. He would develop relations with club custodians and other procurement personnel and pay them kickbacks for awarding him contracts. He would also engage in smuggling or customs violations on imported items.

In 1958 Crum was banned from selling to Army clubs in South Korea following reports that he was giving kickbacks to Non-commissioned officers (NCOs) who served as NCO Club custodians, however the ban was lifted and Crum resumed business. In 1960 further allegations of kickbacks were made, along with accusations that Crum was selling alcohol imported duty free into South Korea with his military club credentials into the South Korean domestic market. Both the U.S. Army Criminal Investigation Division (CID) and South Korean customs authorities were about to take legal action against Crum when he left South Korea for Hong Kong on 13 October 1960.

Operating from Hong Kong through the company Gande, Price Ltd (later renamed Price & Co.), Crum then set up operations at U.S. military facilities elsewhere in Southeast Asia as there was no effective information exchange between U.S. commands regarding his activities. He eventually expanded his business into South Vietnam as the U.S. military presence expanded there.

=== PX scandal ===
The extent of Crum's illicit activities in South Vietnam was made public in the United States Senate Permanent Subcommittee on Investigations investigation into corruption in Army NCO clubs in Vietnam in 1971, known as the PX Scandal. The Senate described Crum as "one of the most powerful, most corrupt and most corrupting vendors in Vietnam during the years of the massive American military presence." He was also described as the "single most powerful American businessman in Vietnam during the period from 1965 through 1970," adopting the same modus operandi as he had used in South Korea.

Crum's initial effort to enter the South Vietnamese market began in August 1965 when two United States Navy PX officers Lieutenants (junior grade) Charles M. Foster and Kim R. Martiny moved into a villa rented by Crum at 42 Phan Dang Phung, Saigon. However they apparently failed to send enough business to Crum and he anonymously reported them to the military authorities.

In September 1965 Crum befriended three civilian officials of the Army-Air Force Regional PX in Saigon, Dick Llewellyn, Pete Mason and Charles Swaford and Lieutenant colonel John Goodlet, who were in charge of transferring PX functions from the Navy's Naval Support Activity Saigon. Crum gave them free accommodation in a Saigon villa with a chef and maid which had a monthly value of approximately $2,000 and regularly threw parties at the villa with large quantities of alcohol and available women. In return, Sarl Electronics, a company represented by Crum received a $1,000,000 exclusive contract for sales and servicing of jukeboxes and pinball machines in all PXs in South Vietnam. Sarl acted as the service agent for Sega in South Vietnam until the South Vietnamese banned Sega machines in late 1969. Through Price & Co, Crum sold frozen pizza and other items to NCO clubs. He also had the franchise for the sale of Carling beer and Jim Beam in South Vietnam. Another Crum company, Century Trading Co. sold textiles and tourist products to PXs.

From his time in South Korea, Crum was friends with Brigadier general Earl F. Cole who served as deputy chief of staff for personnel administration United States Army Vietnam and later with Military Assistance Command, Vietnam (MACV). Crum was reported to have said of Cole "General Cole takes care of me very nicely." Cole was widely said to be receiving approximately $40,000 from illegal activities. A former Crum employee, Jack Bybee, testified that Crum paid Cole $1,000 per month. Crum and Cole socialised weekly in Saigon. Bybee testified that Crum had told him that no one is honest and everyone has their price whether it was a four-star general or a private. Crum was described as "a man with an ingratiating personality, who had all the social graces, including good taste in wine, food etc." and "he seemed to know everyone, to be friends with everyone and to be well liked by everyone."

On 12 September 1966 Crum was awarded the 1st Logistical Command Certificate of Achievement for the period from 1 April to 15 September 1966 by Brigadier general Charles R. Meyer.

In a March 1967 meeting with US Army Headquarters Area Command commander Brigadier general Robert L. Ashworth, Cole told Ashworth: "I knew Crum from before. My people here in Vietnam have made a very thorough investigation of Crum and found him to be very clean and ok."

Crum was reported to have used his influence with Cole and former Sergeant Major of the Army William O. Wooldridge to have Sergeant William Higdon appointed as custodian of the NCO club system at Long Binh Post in November 1967. Higdon testified that between then and July 1968 Crum paid him a total of approximately US$60,000 of kickbacks from the slot machine operations. In August 1968 Wooldridge brokered a deal between Crum and Maredem Inc. (a company owned by Wooldridge, Higdon and Sergeant Hatcher, the custodian of the 1st Infantry Division NCO clubs) under which Maredem would have the monopoly on snack items in the NCO clubs while Crum would have the monopoly on slot machines. Maredem wanted to take control of all operations, but it recognized that Crum was too powerful and was capable of paying larger kickbacks than Maredem.

Crum was reported to have contacts within the Saigon Port who reported to him on rivals trying to import items that competed with Crum's business and the deliveries would never be received or would rot on the docks. When a company attempted to establish a rival slot machine business, Crum reportedly contacted Cole who arranged for a South Vietnamese customs raid that put his potential competitors out of business. Meanwhile Crum's imports encountered no issues with South Vietnamese customs. Cole allowed Crum to store his duty-free goods – freezers, air-conditioners, beer coolers, slot machines and other items at Long Binh Post, knowing that the South Vietnamese customs authorities would not dare attempt a raid there. Similarly General Meyer allowed Crum similar storage privileges at Qui Nhon and these gave him an advantage over any potential competitors.

Crum was reported to have paid off members of the South Vietnamese Fraud Repression Service and was tipped off about an impending raid by the CID allowing them to time to remove incriminating records. Wooldridge testified that Crum had told him that he had attended MACV commander General William Westmoreland's farewell party in July 1968 with Cole and that Crum had paid for a farewell gift.

In March 1969 Joseph DeMarco, a business associate of Crum, supplied a villa in Saigon to two civilian PX employees. In June they were given separate villas which they occupied until December 1969. DeMarco directed Asian operations of Star Distributing Company which was the sole circulation agent for Stars & Stripes in South Vietnam and all other English periodicals for U.S. servicemen in South Vietnam. Star Distributing's exclusive contract was terminated in 1969 when they were found to be involved in black market currency transactions.

The Senate committee heard that Crum planned to expand his business into West Germany when Cole was scheduled to be transferred there to run the PX system. Cole commanded the PX system in western Europe from January to September 1969, when he was removed from the job and recalled to Washington. On 31 July 1970 the Army placed Cole on involuntary retirement after demoting him to Colonel and stripped him of his Distinguished Service Medal. In January 1973 Cole and his and his former secretary, Katherine Jean Baker, were convicted in a US District Court on seven counts of making false statements to cheat the Army in relation to trips to the U.S. made by Baker and authorized by Cole during 1968.

The Senate investigation concluded that Crum's Vietnam business was worth in excess of $40 million. By comparison, a study released in November 1966 found that up to 40% or US$1 billion of U.S. aid to South Vietnam had been lost due to corruption.

Crum's business in South Vietnam continued until December 1970 when the Senate investigation began. Crum was invited to testify before the Senate but a letter sent to Price & Co in Hong Kong was returned marked "Mr. Crum is unknown."

While Senate investigators were unable to locate him, Crum was interviewed by Mike Wallace in Hong Kong in early 1971 for a 60 Minutes segment broadcast on 16 March 1971 titled "How to succeed in the PX business without really trying." Crum denied the charges against him saying "It's an out‐and‐out lie," and called Bybee "an extremely vindictive man."

== Death ==
He died in a fire at his apartment in Hong Kong on 5 February 1977.
