= Joseph M. Heiser Jr. =

United States Army officer

Joseph Miller Heiser Jr.
- Born: 22 January 1914; Charleston, South Carolina
- Died: 9 April 1994 (aged 80); Dumfries, Virginia
- Burial place: Arlington National Cemetery
- Military career
- Allegiance: United States of America
- Branch: United States Army
- Service years: 1942–1973
- Rank: Lieutenant general
- Commands: 1st Logistical Command; Communications Zone, Europe
- Conflicts: World War II; Korean War; Vietnam War
- Awards: Distinguished Service Medal (3); Legion of Merit (2); Bronze Star; Air Medal (8)

Lieutenant General Joseph Miller Heiser Jr. (22 January 1914 – 9 April 1994) was a United States Army officer who served in World War II, the Korean War and the Vietnam War; he oversaw the Army's logistical support operations during the height of the Vietnam War then served as U.S. Army Assistant Chief of Staff for Logistics during the final years of that war.

== Early life ==
He was born in Charleston, South Carolina. He attended Providence College from 1932 to 1934 and then The Citadel from 1939 to 1941.

== Military career ==
He enlisted in the Army as a private in 1942, was promoted to Sergeant, then attended Officer candidate school and was commissioned as a Second lieutenant in the Ordnance Corps in 1943. During World War II he served in the European Theater and was awarded the Legion of Merit for his role as assistant ammunition officer for southern base operations.

He served as assistant Executive Officer to the Chief of Ordnance Major General Everett Hughes from 1946 to 1949.

In January 1951 he was serving as the Division ordinance officer with the 7th Infantry Division in South Korea. He was responsible for reequipping two of the Division's infantry battalions and one artillery battalion following the Hungnam evacuation, for his work he was awarded a second Legion of Merit.

He served as Executive Officer to the Director of Training, Ordnance School from 1951 to 1954. He served as Executive Officer to Chief of Ordnance from 1956 to 1960 and then attended Naval Postgraduate School from 1960 to 1961.

He was selected to attend the University of Chicago obtaining a Master of Business Administration.

He served as Assistant Chief of Staff G-4 (Logistics), 4th Logistical Command from 1961 to 1962, then as Deputy Chief of Staff and then Chief of Staff of that command from 1962 to 1963.

He served as Chief of Staff, Communications Zone, Europe from 1963 to 1965 and then as Commanding General, Communications Zone, Europe 1965 to 1966. He returned to the U.S. and served as Assistant Deputy Chief of Staff for Logistics (Material Readiness) from 1966 to 1968. During this time he developed the closed loop system which emphasized the overhaul of unserviceable equipment and its return to the supply system.

He served as Commanding General, 1st Logistical Command, Vietnam from 1 August 1968 to 22 August 1969. During this time he oversaw the Logistics Offensive to immediately reduce the cost of providing logistics support and yet increase combat effectiveness.

On his return to the U.S. he served as Deputy Chief of Staff (Logistics) from September 1969. He directed the development of the Army's logistics system master plan to improve inventory and location accuracy, reduce supply response times and improve readiness rates.

In 1972 he was described in the United States House Committee on Armed Services as "one of the most competent and knowledgeable logisticians ever to serve the U.S. Army."

He retired from the Army in 1973.

== Later life ==
In 1977, he received the Comptroller General's Award for Public Service.

In 1980 he received the Logistician Emeritus Award from the National Defense Industrial Association.

He authored two books Vietnam Studies Logistic Support (1974) and A Soldier Supporting Soldiers (1991).

He died at his home in Dumfries, Virginia on 9 April 1994 and was buried at Arlington National Cemetery.

== Decorations ==
His decorations include the Distinguished Service Medal (3), the Legion of Merit (2), Bronze Star and the Air Medal (8).
