= List of United States presidential visits to Mexico =

Fifteen presidents of the United States have made thirty-four presidential visits to Mexico. The first visit by an incumbent president to Mexico was made in 1909 by William Howard Taft. It was only the second time in U.S. history that a president left the country while in office.

== Table of visits ==
President	Dates	Locations	Key details
William Howard Taft	October 16, 1909	Ciudad Juárez	Part of an exchange of visits with President Porfirio Díaz across the border.
Franklin D. Roosevelt	April 20, 1943	Monterrey	Part of an exchange of visits with President Manuel Ávila Camacho across the border.
Harry S. Truman	March 3–6, 1947	México, D. F.	State visit; met with President Miguel Alemán Valdés. Also visited the monument to the "Niños Héroes" of Chapultepec.
Dwight D. Eisenhower	October 19, 1953	Nueva Ciudad Guerrero	Dedication of Falcon Dam, with President Adolfo Ruiz Cortines.
Dwight D. Eisenhower	February 19–20, 1959	Acapulco	Informal meeting with President Adolfo López Mateos.
Dwight D. Eisenhower	October 24, 1960	Ciudad Acuña	Informal visit; met with President López Mateos.
John F. Kennedy	June 29 – July 1, 1962	México, D. F.	State visit; met with President López Mateos.
Lyndon B. Johnson	April 14–15, 1966	México, D. F.	Informal visit; met with President Gustavo Díaz Ordaz.
Lyndon B. Johnson	December 3, 1966	Ciudad Acuña	Informal meeting with President Díaz Ordaz. Inspected construction of Amistad Dam.
Lyndon B. Johnson	October 28, 1967	Ciudad Juárez	Attended transfer of El Chamizal from the US. to Mexico and conferred with President Díaz Ordaz.
Richard M. Nixon	September 8, 1969	Ciudad Acuña	Dedication of Amistad Dam with President Díaz Ordaz.
Richard M. Nixon	August 20–21, 1970	Puerto Vallarta	Official visit; met with President Díaz Ordaz.
Gerald R. Ford	October 21, 1974	Nogales, Magdalena de Kino	Met with President Luis Echeverría and laid a wreath at the tomb of Padre Eusebio Kino.
Jimmy Carter	February 14–16, 1979	México, D. F.	State visit; met with President José López Portillo and addressed the Mexican Congress.
Ronald Reagan	January 5, 1981	Ciudad Juárez	Met with President López Portillo. (Visit made as President-elect.)
Ronald Reagan	October 21–24, 1981	Cancún	Attended 22-nation North–South Summit meeting on Cooperation and Development. Met with the Heads of state and government of Algeria, Bangladesh, Canada, China, France, Guyana, India, Japan, Mexico, Nigeria, the Philippines, Saudi Arabia, Sweden, Tanzania, the United Kingdom, Venezuela, and Yugoslavia.
Ronald Reagan	October 8, 1982	Tijuana	Exchange of visits with President-elect Miguel de la Madrid.
Ronald Reagan	August 14, 1983	La Paz	Informal meeting with President de la Madrid.
Ronald Reagan	January 3, 1986	Mexicali	Informal meeting with President de la Madrid.
Ronald Reagan	February 13, 1988	Mazatlán	Informal meeting with President de la Madrid.
George H. W. Bush	November 26–27, 1990	Monterrey, Agualeguas	State Visit; met with President Carlos Salinas de Gortari.
Bill Clinton	May 5–7, 1997	México, D. F., Tlaxcala	State Visit; met with President Ernesto Zedillo.
Bill Clinton	February 14–15, 1999	Mérida	State Visit; met with President Zedillo.
George W. Bush	February 16, 2001	San Cristóbal	Met with President Vicente Fox.
George W. Bush	March 21–22, 2002	Monterrey	Attended the International Conference on Financing for Development and met with President Fox.
George W. Bush	October 26–27, 2002	Los Cabos	Attended the 14th APEC Summit Meeting.
George W. Bush	January 12–13, 2004	Monterrey	Attended the Special Summit of the Americas.
George W. Bush	March 30–31, 2006	Cancun, Chichen-Itza	Attended the 2nd North American Leaders' Summit with President Fox and Canadian Prime Minister Stephen Harper; visited the Chichen-Itza archaeological site.
George W. Bush	March 12–14, 2007	Mérida, Uxmal	Met with President Felipe Calderón; visited the Maya ruin complex of Uxmal.
Barack Obama	April 16–17, 2009	Mexico City	Met with President Calderón.
Barack Obama	August 9–10, 2009	Guadalajara	Attended the 5th North American Leaders' Summit with President Calderón and Prime Minister Harper.
Barack Obama	June 17–19, 2012	Los Cabos	Attended the G-20 Summit meeting.
Barack Obama	May 2–3, 2013	Mexico City	Met with President Enrique Peña Nieto.
Barack Obama	February 19, 2014	Toluca	Attended the 7th North American Leaders' Summit with President Peña and Prime Minister Harper.
Joe Biden	January 8–10, 2023	Mexico City	Attended the 10th North American Leaders' Summit with President Andrés Manuel López Obrador and Canadian Prime Minister Justin Trudeau.

== See also ==
- Mexico–United States relations
- Foreign policy of the United States
- Foreign relations of the United States
