= Robert E. Adamson Jr. =

United States Navy admiral

Robert E. Adamson
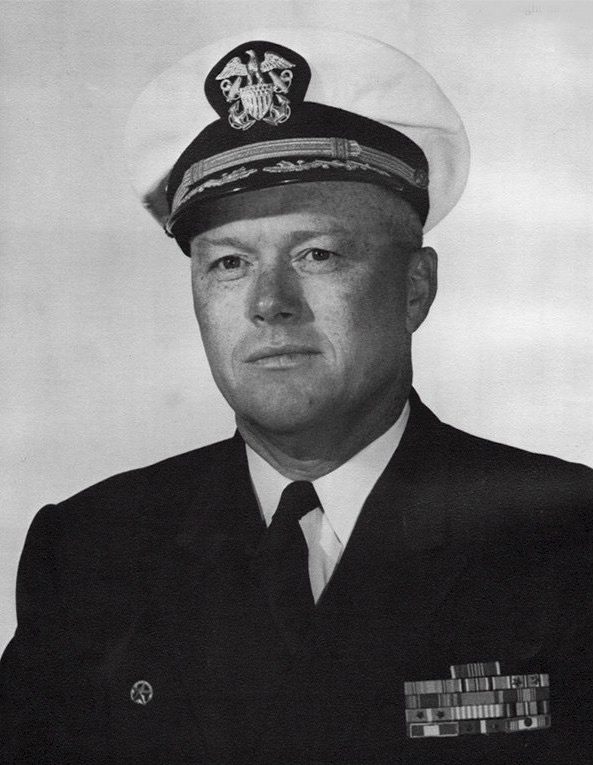
- Born: Robert Edward Adamson Jr. December 28, 1920; Chicago, Illinois
- Died: July 30, 2004 (aged 83); Williamsburg, Virginia
- Burial place: Arlington National Cemetery
- Education: United States Naval Academy (1944); Naval Postgraduate School
- Spouse: Carolyn "Lyn" Axberg (m. 1945)
- Children: 3
- Military career
- Allegiance: United States of America
- Branch: United States Navy
- Service years: 1943–1977
- Rank: Vice admiral
- Nickname: "Rojo"
- Commands: USS Naifeh; Reserve Escort Squadron 12; USS Wiltsie (DD-716); USS Mullany (DD-528); Destroyer Division 152; USS Galveston (CL-93); Task Force 86; Naval Support Activity Danang; Naval Support Activity Saigon; South Atlantic Force; SURFLANT
- Conflicts: World War II • Battle of Eniwetok • Gilbert and Marshall Islands campaign • Battle of Tarawa • Battle of the Philippine Sea; Korean War; Vietnam War

Robert Edward Adamson Jr. (December 28, 1920 – July 30, 2004) was a decorated commander in the United States Navy who served during World War II, the Korean War, and the Vietnam War, and reached the rank of vice admiral.

== Early life ==
Adamson was born in Chicago, Illinois, son of Robert Edward Adamson Sr. and Helen Myra Adamson (née Flinn). He attended Newtown High School and Bayside High School before beginning his higher education at Columbia University. In 1940 Adamson received his appointment to the United States Naval Academy, Annapolis, Maryland. Adamson graduated with distinction with the Class of 1944, which graduated in June 1943, accelerated due to World War II. Adamson was immediately commissioned as an ensign in the United States Navy.

== World War II ==
After being commissioned, ENS Adamson became a student at the Naval Air Station in Jacksonville, Florida. Following his schooling, ENS Adamson reported in September 1943 for duty aboard the USS San Diego (CL-53). The USS San Diego joined the USS Saratoga in support of the invasion of Munda, New Georgia, and of Bougainville. Then supported the Bombing of Rabaul in November 1943. Ens Adamson aboard the USS Diego then took part in Battle of Tarawa 20–23 November 1943. She then escorted the USS Lexington back to Pearl Harbor for repairs. On 6 January 1944 the USS San Diego became part of Task Force 58 under command of Rear Admiral Marc Mitscher. Adamson then took part in Operations Flintlock and the Battle of Tarawa. The San Diego had some improvements made on her radar in San Francisco and headed back into the fight joining in on raids against Wake and Marcus Islands, the invasion of Saipan, the Battle of the Philippine Sea, the invasion of Guam and Tinian, and the first raids against the Philippines.

== Post-war ==
From August to November 1945, Adamson reported to Gunnery Officers School in Washington DC. After completing school, Adamson reported for duty aboard the USS Massachusetts (BB-59) as a Division Officer and Assistant Gunnery Officer. When LT Adamson was sent to the USS Massachusetts, she was in Puget Sound being overhauled. At the end of January she set sail for Hampton Roads, Virginia. In September 1946 LT Adamson joined the Staff of Commander Battleship-Cruiser Force, Atlantic Fleet as Aide and Flag Lieutenant.

In June 1947, Adamson returned to Annapolis to attend a course in ordnance engineering. The following June, Adamson began to receive instruction at the Massachusetts Institute of Technology in Cambridge, Massachusetts. In June 1950, Adamson received a Master of Science in Physics from MIT. After graduating, Adamson's next assignment was as an Operations Officer and Physicist with Joint Task Force Three (Preparation for Operation Greenhouse) under Task Group 31.1 at Los Alamos, New Mexico. Adamson was with Task Group 31.1 from July 1950 until July 1951, for his service there he was awarded the Air Force Commendation Medal. In July 1951 Adamson reported to Los Alamos Scientific Laboratory as a physicist, and stayed there until December. When finished with his assignment at Los Alamos, Adamson reported to the USS Brown (DD-546) as operations officer and executive officer. While aboard the USS Brown, Adamson participated in operation in Korean waters during the Korean War.

== Senior officer ==
In February 1954, LCDR Adamson became a staff officer with the Military Liaison Committee to the Atomic Energy Commission. He kept this position until May 1956, at which time he became the commander of the USS Naifeh. While commanding the USS Naifeh, Adamson from January until June 1958 also was the commander of Reserve Escort Squadron TWELVE. In July 1958 until July 1959, Adamson reported to the Army Command and General Staff College at Fort Leavenworth, Kansas. After finishing his training, Adamson was assigned to the Livermore Branch, Field Command, Armed Forces Special Weapons Project, Livermore, California, and stayed there until July 1961. When finished, he took his next position as commander of the USS Wiltsie (DD-716) and in January 1962 became the commander of the USS Mullany (DD-528). In October 1963 took command of the Destroyer Division ONE HUNDRED FIFTY-TWO.

Adamson served as Assistant Chief of Staff for Operations and Plans to Commander Cruiser-Destroyer Force, Pacific Fleet, and in December 1965 assumed command of USS Galveston (CL-93). In February 1967 he became the head of the General Purpose Objective Forces Section, Strategic Plans Division, Office of the Chief of Naval Operations, Navy Department and in September 1967 became Deputy Commander Naval Ship Systems Command for Maintenance and Logistic Support, Washington, DC. Adamson was awarded the Legion of Merit for his service as Deputy Commander Naval Ship Systems Command.

In December 1969 he took command of the US Naval Support Activity Danang, South Vietnam and later in July 1970 became Commander Naval Support Activity Saigon, South Vietnam. For his service as commander of US Naval Support Activity in Danang and Saigon, Adamson was awarded the Distinguished Service Medal.

In January 1971 Adamson was assigned brief duty in the Bureau of Naval Personnel, and in March 1971, assumed command of the South Atlantic Force, US Atlantic Fleet. For his service as command of the South Atlantic Force, RADM Adamson was awarded a Gold Star in lieu of the Second Legion of Merit. In June 1972 he became Deputy Chief of Naval Operations (Surface Warfare), Navy Department and in June 1974 was ordered detached for duty as Special Assistant to the Commander in Chief, US Atlantic Fleet. In January 1975, Adamson took command of the amphibious force, the cruiser-destroyer force, the service force and the mine warfare force were merged into the Naval Surface Force, U.S. Atlantic Fleet (SURFLANT). Adamson commanded SURFLANT upon its establishment until his retirement on July 1, 1977.

== Later life ==
Adamson married Carolyn Axberg on 18 August 1945. They had three children.

After retiring from the U.S. Navy, Vice Admiral Adamson retired with his wife to Williamsburg, Virginia. Adamson died in 2004 at the age of 83 and was interred in Arlington National Cemetery.

== Awards ==

Navy Distinguished Service Medal
Legion of Merit with gold star	Air Force Commendation Medal	China Service Medal with two stars	American Defense Service Medal
American Campaign Medal	Asiatic-Pacific Campaign Medal with two stars	World War II Victory Medal	National Defense Service Medal with bronze star
Korean Service Medal with two stars	Armed Forces Expeditionary Medal (Quemoy and Matsu Islands)	Vietnam Service Medal	Presidential Unit Citation (Philippines)
Presidential Unit Citation (Korea)	Philippine Liberation Ribbon with two stars	United Nations Service Medal	Vietnamese Naval Distinguished Service Order
