= Timeline of the Richard Nixon presidency (1969) =

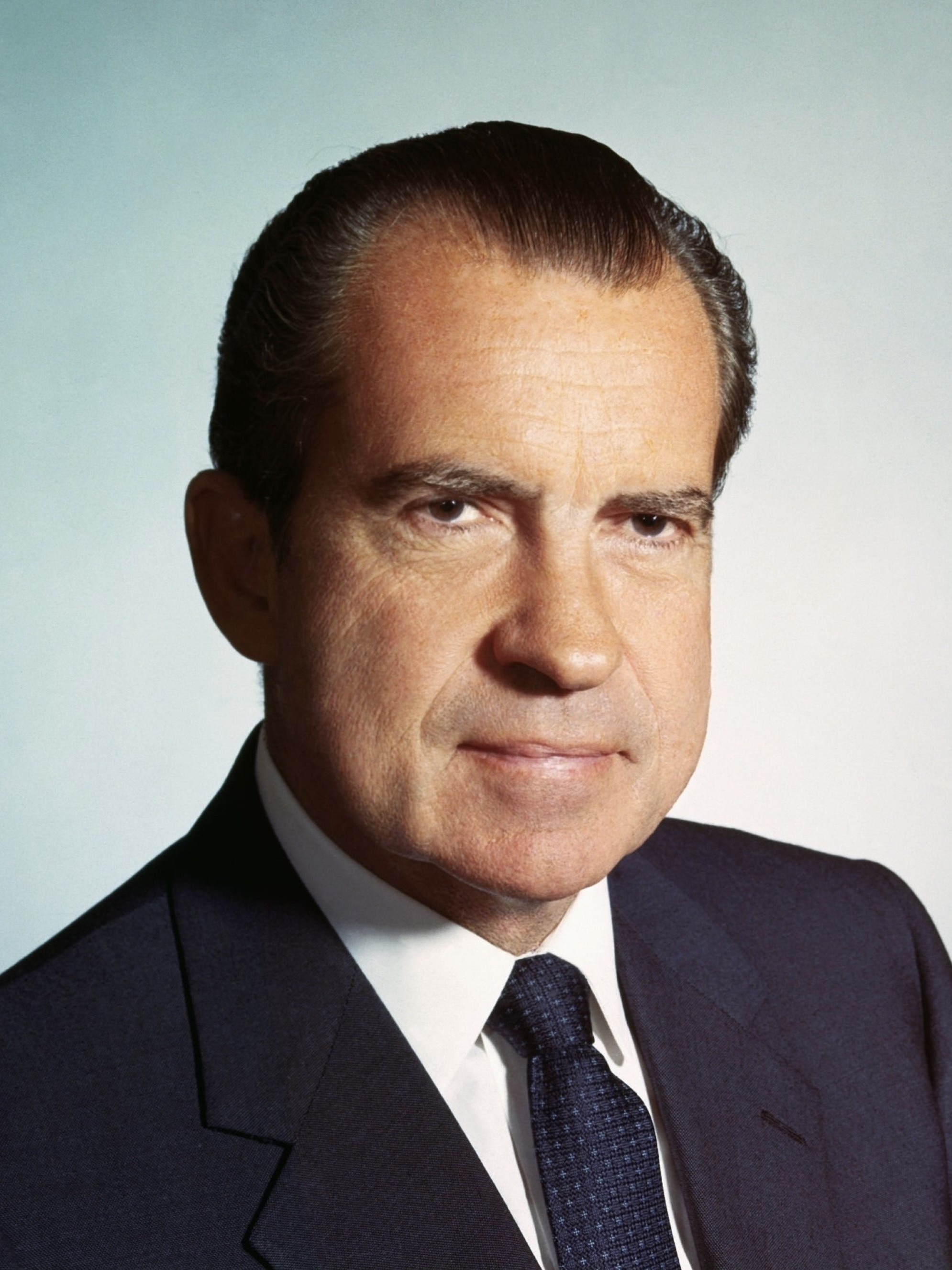
Nixon in 1969

The following is a timeline of the presidency of Richard Nixon from his inauguration as the 37th president of the United States on January 20, 1969, to December 31, 1969.

== January ==
- January 20 – Richard Nixon's presidency begins with his inauguration at the United States Capitol in Washington, D.C.; the oath of office is administered by Chief Justice Earl Warren. President Nixon declared in his inaugural address, "The greatest honor that history can bestow is the title of peacemaker." The Nixon Administration initiates Détente.
- January 21 – President Nixon states his intent to wake early and sleep late to a group of campaign workers. Nixon attends a ceremony for the swearing in of 81 White House staff members.
- January 22 – George W. Romney resigns as Governor of Michigan to be sworn in as the 3rd Secretary of Housing and Urban Development.
- January 28 – President Nixon speaks to members of the House rules committee and House leadership during a luncheon.
- January 31 – President Nixon visits an African-American neighborhood without announcement in Washington in the morning hours, traveling there for the purpose of witnessing a vest pocket park and playground under Romney's suggestion.

== February ==
- February 2 – White House Urban Affairs Advisor Daniel Patrick Moynihan says solving problems in American cities will require "cold cash", suggesting a federal finance program for allowances of families and children.
- February 3 – The White House announces President Nixon's intent to visit numerous western European countries in the next two months.
- February 5 – President Nixon gives authorization to a ceiling raise on the National Science Foundation's expenditures by 10 million at multiple universities to help research among hardships caused by limitations in spending.
- February 6 – President Nixon says he wants promises from American commanders prior to agreement with South Vietnam leader Nguyen Van Thieu troop withdraw in Vietnam.
- February 8 – President Nixon directs Lee DuBridge for national space program examination and afterward have a possible cost reduction follow up report.
- February 10 – Ronald Ziegler says President Nixon will travel to West Berlin despite plans by East Germany to limit routes to the city on land due to the upcoming West German presidential election. President Nixon holds a White House state dining room dinner honoring Robert Menzies while he is visiting in Washington.
- February 11 – President Nixon blames the previous administration under former President Lyndon B. Johnson for allowing off shore drilling which caused the previous weeks' oil spillage in Santa Clara, California, at the same time announcing his directing of Lee DuBridge to bring about a group of scientists and engineers to form a plan on taking the most effective use of the federal government in cleaning the shoreline California and preventing such a pollution disaster from another occurrence.
- February 13 – President Nixon promises the federal government's aid in American city problems though insists assistance from the local government is the common problem solver for inner city issues during a ceremony at the White House for the swearing in of Walter Washington as Mayor of the District of Columbia.
- February 15 – Following rejecting a request by President Nixon to work full-time, part-time consultant to the president on consumer affairs Willie Mae Rogers quits.
- February 19 – In the night hours it is discovered that President Nixon will spend the most time with France's Charles de Gaulle of the five country leaders he will be meeting the following week.
- February 22 – Secretary of the Treasury Kennedy denies his remarks from a week prior have caused the market drop during an interview.
- February 24 – President Nixon announces the development of negotiations with the Soviet Union and the US's full cooperation with European allies during a speech to NATO.
- February 27 – President Nixon pledges allied safeguarding of Berlin will remain while touring West Berlin.
- February 28 – President Nixon and President of France Charles de Gaulle conduct a meeting on American-French relations in Paris.

== March ==
- March 1 – Nixon concludes his discussions with de Gaulle and a spokesman for the latter says the meeting resulted in "very good results for relations between our two countries".
- March 2 – President Nixon returns to the US at Andrews Air Force Base during the evening.
- March 9 – President Nixon holds a two-hour meeting with White House aides on the subject of antiballistic missile system deployment at his beachfront villa in Key Biscayne, Florida.
- March 16 – President Nixon and First Lady Pat Nixon attend a White House gathering of 350 dignitaries and friends. Secretary of Commerce Stans states the possibility of having the Nixon administration halt price increases of excessive quality that could harm the American economy during an appearance on Face the Nation.
- March 19 – Secretary of Defense Laird says that he is not aware of a plan to reduce American troops from within South Vietnam while speaking to the Senate Armed Forces Committee.
- March 20 – Secretary of Defense Laird states the Nixon administration's modified Sentinel antiballistic missile system will defend the US "because it protects our deterrent."
- March 25 – In a meeting with Republican leaders, President Nixon promises to ask for an extension by one year of the tax surcharge by 10% and excise taxes on automobiles and communication during the following day. President Nixon says the progression toward peace in South Vietnam is held in the hands of private conversation during a National Association of Broadcasters luncheon.
- March 26 – President Nixon keeps his promise from the previous day and asks Congress for a year long 10% surtax and vows he will make major federal spending cuts to double the surplus of the budget.
- March 28 – Former President Dwight Eisenhower dies.

== April ==
- April 1 – Secretary of Defense Laird says South Vietnam will see a reduction in the number of B-52 bomber sorties.
- April 2 – President Nixon is joined by former President Johnson in attending the burial of former President Eisenhower in Abilene, Kansas.
- April 3 – Secretary of Defense Laird says peace negotiations connected to Vietnam but from "outside" are proceeding and "signs of progress" have occurred.
- April 4 – On the first anniversary of the assassination of Martin Luther King Jr., while on his way to a meeting in Florida, United States Secretary of Health and Human Services Robert Finch has a 45-minute conversation with King's widow, Coretta Scott King, in her home in Atlanta, Georgia at the request of President Nixon.
- April 7 – Secretary of State Rogers states the Nixon administration wants a troop withdrawal on both sides ahead of the end of the year during his first press conference.
- April 8 – President Nixon issues a statement declaring his intent to use over 200 million in rebuilding riot torn cities.
- April 28 – President Nixon sends a message to Congress for the creation of representation of the District of Columbia within the federal government. President Nixon says a candidate's views on the antiballistic missile program would not be a factor in being confirmed for the position of Director of the National Science Foundation. President Nixon telephones the attendees of the champagne breakfast celebrating the debuting daily newspaper Chicago Today. President Nixon sends a letter to Charles de Gaulle addressing his resignation as President of France praising his tenure.
- April 29 – President Nixon encourages university administrators to stand up against protestors who engage in lawless dissent on campuses. President Nixon plays piano for the 70th birthday celebration of Duke Ellington at the White House.

== May ==
- May 2 – President Nixon asks Congress to allow three new legislative measures for the suppression of what the president claims is a record flooding of sexual content in mail to US homes. President Nixon sends a special message to Congress regarding obscene and pornographic materials.
- May 3 – President Nixon visits former Governor of South Carolina James F. Byrnes to congratulate him on being married for 60 years and turning 90 years old. White House sources say President Nixon would be willing to accept a private joint troop removal from Vietnam deal with Hanoi in the event that definite safeguards are imposed to ensure the pact would not be violated.
- May 4 – Secretary of Transportation Volpe rebukes students carrying firearms during a speech to thousands celebrating Polish Constitution Day.
- May 27 – President Nixon announces his choice of Charles A. Bane for the United States Court of Appeals for the Seventh Circuit.
- May 28 – President Nixon requests of Congress the approval of a 2.6 billion foreign aid program channeling more private enterprise to overseas and focusing on technical help.
- May 31 – President Nixon has a meeting with Secretary of State Rogers on peace in Vietnam. Press aid Ronald Ziegler says the position of support for President Nixon's eight-point peace plan by Nguyen Van Thieu had not changed. After the meeting, the president and secretary of state join the Nixon family in a trip to the Bahamas.

== June ==
- June 1 – President Nixon returns to Washington in the night hours.
- June 2 – Former Vice President Hubert Humphrey defends President Nixon against critics of his methods to end the war, saying he believes Nixon "wants peace and I think he's trying to find it." President Nixon meets with Minister for Foreign Affairs Kiichi Aichi for a non-formal talk particularly in regards to Okinawa and issues of trade. The White House says the meeting is meant to serve as a preliminary for the upcoming meeting between President Nixon and Eisaku Satō.
- June 3 – President Nixon appears on the campus of General Beadle State College while there to dedicate a library housing the papers of Senator Karl Mundt, saying the US has the power to crush revolutionaries, who he defines as youngsters choosing to not partake in the process giving continuity to civilization.
- June 5 – Secretary of State Rogers holds a news conference where he asserts the South Vietnamese armed forces are willing and able to take more responsibilities in Vietnam. Nixon announces his choice of Donald Johnson as the new head of the Veterans administration, introducing him in front of the Newporter inn's temporary office close to Newport Beach.
- June 6 – President Nixon orders $500,000 to the state of Illinois after damages caused to the state by a spring flood.
- June 8 – President Nixon meets with President of South Vietnam Nguyen Van Thieu at the Midway Island, during which President Nixon announces a scheduled withdrawal of 25,000 at the end of August.
- June 10 – President Nixon says North Vietnam will be the reason for a failing of peace if it continues to not act toward reciprocal moves in favor of ending conflict during an appearance on the South Lawn. Secretary of the Treasury Kennedy says the US is close to runaway inflation during a press conference. Deputy Defense Secretary Packard announces the cancellation of the manned orbiting laboratory (MOL) program.
- June 13 – The Department of Defense announces the 900 man battalion will be the first American unit brought back from Vietnam.
- June 28 – The White House announces President Nixon's plan to attend the Apollo 11 splashdown and subsequently travel to five Asian countries alongside communist Romania in an attempt to form a new US policy in Southeast Asia after the Vietnam War concludes.
- June 29 – CBS Radio states Secretary of Health, Education, and Welfare Finch intends to notifying the American Medical Association of plans by the Nixon administration on limiting doctors' fees in Medicaid aid cases the following day.

== July ==
- July 1 – Vice President Agnew places the blame for the uncompromising stance by the enemy on criticisms made toward the Nixon administration's policy in Vietnam during an address at the Midwestern Governors' Conference.
- July 2 – Secretary of State Rogers says it remains uncertain the US is being sent a peace sign by Hanoi despite admitting the decrease of enemy hostility in Vietnam during a press conference. President Nixon arrives in Key Biscayne, Florida for the beginning of a vacation for the upcoming Independence Day.
- July 3 – The Nixon administration announces its choice to eliminate desegregating southern school deadlines and simultaneously promises "immediate and massive attention" toward undoing de facto segregation in large cities within other parts of the US. President Nixon says the US wishes to begin discussing strategic arms limitations with the Soviet Union by "July 31 or shortly thereafter" while in Geneva, Switzerland.
- July 4 – President Nixon radios a praiseful message to a group of explorers crossing the Atlantic Ocean while in an Egyptian reed boat.
- July 5 – President Nixon announces the names of the US delegation to the discussion with Russia on strategic arm limitations.
- July 6 – President Nixon returns to Washington from his five-day vacation.
- July 7 – The White House announces President Nixon's addressing of medical cost increases in three days following a scheduled meeting with Secretary of Health, Education, and Welfare Finch.
- July 8 – President Nixon meets with Representative Catherine May in the White House for discussions on the advancement of female equality. President Nixon greets Emperor of Ethiopia Haile Selassie at the White House for the beginning of a four-day visit by the emperor. President Nixon requests Congress extend the insurance of the unemployed to 4.8 million in a message to both chambers.
- July 10 – President Nixon praises the report on health care released earlier in the day by Secretary of Health, Education, and Welfare Finch which he cites as leading to his realization on the seriousness of the errors in the national health field. President Nixon announces his nominations of Talyor Belcher for United States Ambassador to Peru and Walter Rice for United States Ambassador to Australia.
- July 11 – Attorney General Mitchell requests that Congress allow potential dangerous persons to be imprisoned without bail for up to 60 days in a letter. President Nixon meets with his former golf caddie Harold Bell at the White House. The Pentagon discloses that it has begun conducting open air tests for the purpose of identifying lethal nerve gas at three locations across the US.
- July 12 – Senate Democratic Leader Mike Mansfield claims President Nixon has privately ordered a reducing in pressure from the military in Vietnam as an attempt to dismiss Paris peace talks amid an interview.
- July 14 – Attorney General Mitchell announces the Nixon administration is doing less electronic surveillance than the administration of his direct predecessor Lyndon B. Johnson during a press conference.
- July 20 – Apollo 11 lands the first two humans, Americans Neil Armstrong and Buzz Aldrin, on the Moon. Nixon makes the longest long distance phone call in history.
- July 25 – The Nixon Doctrine (also known as the Guam Doctrine) is put forth during a press conference in Guam by President Nixon. Secretary of Housing and Urban Development Romney calls for a nation dependent upon its people rather than government in remarks before 170 mayors from Illinois.
- July 26 – President Nixon says he is determined in finding a way toward swaying the Asian nations to take the lead in their collective defense while the US remains in a smaller and supportive role while in Manila.
- July 27 – President Nixon ends his discussions on the Asia-Pacific region's future with President of the Philippines Ferdinand Marcos.

== August ==
- August 1 – Head of State of Cambodia Norodom Sihanouk formally invites President Nixon to pay an official visit to Cambodia the next time he takes a trip to Asia.
- August 2 – President Nixon leaves Pakistan and Asia.
- August 3 – Secretary of State Rogers says the US wants to improve relations with Red China by holding discussions during a press conference in Hong Kong. President Nixon returns to Washington during the night hours.
- August 4 – National Security Advisor Kissinger meets with President of France Georges Pompidou in Paris during the afternoon. The House votes 237 to 170 in approval of a bill extending the surcharge on income taxes by 10% until January 1.
- August 8 – Nixon gives his first major address on domestic policy, announcing plans for welfare reform and returning greater authority to state and local governments. Secretary of State Rogers says the US will approach communist China to resume discussions of formality broken off by the Chinese the previous year during a meeting at the Australian National Press club.
- August 9 – President Nixon states his support for the Equal Employment Opportunity commission having the right to directly proceed to federal courts in combatting private employers having job discrimination.
- August 10 – Daniel Moynihan concedes that the Nixon administration has faced internal conflict over the proposed welfare reform during an appearance on Meet the Press.
- August 11 – President Nixon sends a message to Congress requesting a study of the various proposals made to reform the US welfare system and announces changes being made to the office of economic opportunity, the basic responsibility of the office of economic opportunity under the Nixon administration now being government social pioneering research and development.
- August 12 – President Nixon submits his manpower training proposals to Congress, the program meant to reduce unemployment.
- August 13 – President Nixon holds a dinner for Neil Armstrong, Edwin Aldrin, Jr., and Michael Collins.
- August 14 – The White House announces President Nixon remains unsure of whether to order a second contingent of withdrawal of American troops from South Vietnam. Secretary of the Treasury Kennedy says inflation will cut the value of the dollar in 11 years.
- August 17 – Nixon travels to Palm Springs, California for a golf game during the latter hours of the day.
- August 18 – President Nixon announces his nomination of Clement Furman Haynsworth for Associate Justice of the Supreme Court to replace the vacancy left by Abe Fortas.
- August 19 – President Nixon declares Louisiana a major disaster area and directs Vice President Agnew and Secretary of Housing and Urban Development Romney to fly to New Orleans for the purpose of inspecting stricken areas via helicopter.
- August 20 – The World Council of Churches declares the US as needing to cease lack of communication with Cuba as well as cease its economic embargo during the evening.
- August 21 – Secretary of Defense Laird announces defense spending being cut by 1.5 billion and a 100,000 military personnel reduction in the upcoming fiscal year.
- August 22 – Secretary of the Navy Chafee lists 76 naval ships to be deactivated as a result of the Pentagon's spending cut of 3 billion.
- August 30 – Due to the damage in southern and western parts of Illinois started on June 29, President Nixon designates the state a major disaster area.

== September ==
- September 1 – President Nixon delivers a speech at the 61st Annual National Governors Conference in Colorado Springs.
- September 2 – The National Governors Conference adopts a resolution in support of compulsory health insurance. It is learned during the night hours, via a closed session with the governors in Colorado Springs, that the Nixon administration intends to slash funding for new construction projects by 75% to aid the war against inflation.
- September 3 – Federal highway administrator F. C. Turner confirms the Nixon administration is supporting of a bill allowing larger buses and trucks on the interstate highways during an appearance before a House public works subcommittee.
- September 4 – President Nixon orders an imminent federal government construction projects funding cut of 75% to rise private home building and that the cutback will persist "until conditions ease".
- September 5 – Senator Al Gore, Sr. charges the Nixon administration tax reform bill with "making it easy for people with very high incomes to pay very low taxes" during a Senate finance committee hearing.
- September 6 – Secretary of Defense Laird issues a temporary suspension of 700 million for army construction.
- September 7 – President Nixon issues a statement in praise of Senator Everett Dirksen.
- September 8 – President Nixon announces a celebration world tour by America's first men to walk the moon will begin either September 29 or September 30.
- September 9 – Nixon eulogizes Senator Dirksen after the arrival of Dirksen's body in Washington.
- September 10 – It is disclosed that Senator William Fulbright unsuccessfully called on President Nixon to send a US representative to the funeral of Chairman of the Central Committee of the Workers' Party of Vietnam Ho Chi Minh.
- September 11 – The White House announces President Nixon's intention to speak at the United Nations general assembly in New York the following Thursday.
- September 12 – President Nixon orders the resuming of air bombing in South Vietnam, the White House concurrently stating the purpose of the continuation was behind enemy offense harkening back to a pre-cease-fire level. The United States Civil Rights commission charges the Nixon administration with walking back its stated intent to support desegregation in schools.
- September 18 – President Nixon delivers an address to the 24th Session of the General Assembly of the United Nations at the United Nations headquarters in New York during the morning.
- September 19 – President Nixon holds a news briefing, in which he unveils plans to change previous draft calls throughout the final months of the year and pending legislation relating to drafting, in the Roosevelt Room during the morning.
- September 20 – President Nixon delivers an address to Association of Student Governments members in the Roosevelt Room during the afternoon.
- September 22 – President Nixon issues a statement concernin the Construction Industry Collective Bargaining Commission.
- September 23 – President Nixon announces his choice to continue supersonic transport development in a speech in the Roosevelt Room during the morning.
- September 24 – President Nixon issues a statement on the District of Columbia subway station.
- September 26 – President Nixon predicts Haynsworth will be confirmed by the Senate to the Supreme Court during a press conference. President Nixon says unjust wage and price increases being asked for by the labor and management groups will result in them being priced "out of the market". President Nixon says the Vietnam War could end sooner if unity across the US occurs in response to criticisms of his foreign policy. President Nixon delivers an address concerning the leaving of Prime Minister of Israel Golda Meir in the Roosevelt Room in which he reflects on their discussions during the afternoon.
- September 29 – The White House says President Nixon's choices on withdrawals of troops from Vietnam War will be permitted based on upcoming circumstances unforeseeable. Secretary of the Army Resor announces his ordering of charges of murder against Green Berets in Vietnam be dismissed immediately and the "men will be assigned to duties outside" of Vietnam.

== October ==
- October 1 – The Justice Department requests the Supreme Court to strike against a lower court decision in favor of Chicago denizens being able to pursue allegations that the House committee on un-American activities.
- October 2 – The White House reports President Nixon as remaining committed to the nomination of Haynsworth to the Supreme Court amid claims the latter asked for a withdrawal of his name. Haynsworth denies asking Nixon to withdraw his name during the evening.
- October 3 – President Nixon creates an emergency board to investigate the threatened walkouts against six US railroad systems. Secretary of Health, Education, and Welfare Finch says the Nixon administration is developing a community college program to assist "forgotten Americans" during an address to the American Association of Junior Colleges.
- October 6 – President Nixon announces his appointing of a task force of 16 members meant to study dilemmas in education.
- October 7 – Secretary of Defense Laird says the Nixon administration has begun the pursuit of what he calls a dual course to withdraw the American military from Vietnam during a speech to the annual convention of the AFL-CIO.
- October 8 – Consumer Advisor to the President Virginia Knauer says the administration's anti-inflation policies are causing a decrease in the cost of meat.
- October 10 – President Nixon announces Director of Selective Service Lewis B. Hershey will be replaced during the upcoming February.
- October 11 – President Nixon sends a special message to Congress calling for a bipartisan effort on enacting the legislative program of his administration. Secretary of the Interior Hickel says he ordered the change in the official seal of the Interior Department due to large opposition within the department and public.
- October 12 – Secretary of State Rogers reports President Nixon as having made "tremendous progress" within his effort to deescalate Vietnam during a television interview.
- October 13 – The White House announces a November 3 radio and television broadcast of President Nixon giving a situation report on Vietnam. United States Secretary of the Army Stanley Rogers Resor calls on army commanders to pay attention to race relations within the army with sensitivity during a speech to the Association of the United States Army.
- October 14 – Vice President Agnew calls on members of Congress as well as sponsors of protesters to repudiate a letter by North Korea Prime Minister Phạm Văn Đồng wishing success to the protestors. President Nixon attends a service commemorating what would have been the 79th birthday of the late former President Eisenhower.
- October 15 – The Department of Defense announces the names of ten casualties in the Vietnam War.
- October 16 – The White House announces President Nixon will discuss price inflation and the high living costs in a nationwide radio broadcast during the afternoon of the following day. Secretary of Defense Laird says his budget will have the Defense Department keep several thousand men in Vietnam during a Pentagon press conference.
- October 17 – President Nixon delivers a national address from the White House on inflation and the high cost of living. President Nixon announces his nomination of Arthur Burns for Chairman of the Federal Reserve Board.
- October 20 – President Nixon defends Haynsworth as being the subject of "vicious character assassination" during a press conference. The Nixon administration proposes possession of narcotics for the purpose of personal usage be changed from a misdemeanor to a felony.
- October 21 – President Nixon meets with Russian cosmonauts Georgej T. Beregovoi and Konstantin Feoktistov at the White House on the second day of the two week tour by the duo across the US.
- October 22 – Secretary of Defense Laird announces his opposition to a proposal by Senator Hugh Scott calling on President Nixon to set a date in for a Vietnam unilateral ceasefire while speaking to reporters. The Senate votes 49 to 24 in favor of liberalizing trade with the Soviet Union as well as its affiliates.
- October 23 – Secretary of Housing and Urban Development Romney speaks on the possibility of income tax deductions assigned to home mortgage interest being reduced and used for the rebuilding of US slums while speaking at the dedication of the Federal National Mortgage association headquarters.

== November ==
- November 1 – Sources disclose a document in the high command of the Viet Cong stating the plan by President Nixon to gradually withdraw from Vietnam is doomed.
- November 2 – Attorney General Mitchell states the intent of the Justice Department to carry out the a mandate by the Supreme Court to immediately desegregate southern schools during an appearance on Meet the Press.
- November 3 – President Nixon delivers a televised evening address on the subject of the Vietnam War in his White House office.
- November 4 – President Nixon issues a statement on the National Program for Voluntary Action.
- November 5 – President Nixon makes a joint North Lawn appearance with First Lady Nixon, Vice President Agnew, Judy Agnew, Governor-elect of New Jersey William T. Cahill, and Governor-elect of Virginia Linwood Holton during the afternoon.
- November 12 – Secretary of Health, Education, and Welfare Finch states an interest in having DDT be cut down over the course of two year during a press conference.
- November 19 – President Nixon meets with Prime Minister of Japan Eisaku Satō in the Oval Office for discussions on negotiating a return of Okinawa to Japan.
- November 20 – President Nixon accepts the resignation of Henry Cabot Lodge for the American delegation heading to the Vietnam peace negotiations.
- November 21 – The US agrees to return Okinawa to Japan after 24 years of ownership. The Senate votes 55 to 45 in a rejection of Haynsworth for the Supreme Court.
- November 22 – President Nixon pledges to assist Illinois Republicans in the 1970 midterm elections as a payback for assistance with his presidential campaign the previous year.
- November 24 – President Nixon and Secretary of State Rogers sign the nuclear nonproliferation treaty to cause ratifications to the American pact of the agreement. Press Secretary Ronald Ziegler says President Nixon will make an important announcement the following day without disclosing the nature of the revelation.

== December ==
- December 1 – The Senate votes for a two and a half percent decrease in oil tax depletion from the present twenty-seven and a half, bring the total to 25%.
- December 2 – The House votes 333 to 55 in favor of President Nixon's peace resolution in Vietnam during the evening.
- December 9 – President Nixon instructs Secretary of State William Rogers to formulate the Rogers Plan, a framework to achieve an end to belligerence in the Arab–Israeli conflict following the Six-Day War and the continuing War of Attrition.
- December 11 – The White House accepts a voting rights proposal giving coverage to all 50 states.
- December 12 – Vice President Agnew claims the Nixon administration is being jeopardized in its efforts to curb inflation by a tax reform bill in the Senate that he calls "irresponsible tinkering" during a speech at the winter conference of the Republican Governors association.
- December 13 – State Department spokesman Elliot L. Richardson during a press conference confirms the US will give 1.2 million USD to Latin America even if Congress makes cuts to foreign aid.
- December 14 – The White House announces President Nixon will make a national report on Vietnam the following day on television and radio.
- December 15 – President Nixon announces the withdrawal of 50,000 American troops in Vietnam over the course of the next four months during a television and radio address. The US and Soviet Union hold their ninth preliminary strategic arms discussions at the US embassy in Helsinki, Finland. The Senate votes 85 to 4 in approval an appropriations bill for the fiscal year of 1970 of 69.3 billion.
- December 16 – President Nixon lights the national Christmas tree during the evening. Secretary of Defense Laird says the planned withdrawal of 50,000 men from Vietnam will cut the following year's draft by 25,000 during a press conference at the Pentagon.
- December 18 – US spokesman Steven Ledogar says negotiations have already been downgraded by Hanoi, who he charges as not taking the discussions seriously, and North Korea chief delegate boycotts will not make a "difference". President Nixon announces his intention to veto a money bill he claims is inflammatory in a letter arriving on Capitol Hill during the evening.
- December 20 – President Nixon meets with Republican congressional leaders for discussions on tax reform. Labor Secretary Shultz charges lobbying on the part of both building trades and AFL-CIO with attempting to block "skilled and high paying jobs" for black Americans and other minorities.
- December 28 – United Nations Undersecretary Ralph Bunche says the Nixon administration does not have the confidence of black Americans in being convincing as trying to make gains in racial equality during an interview.
- December 29 – The White House announces President Nixon will make progression on a tax reform bill that also increases Social Security benefits by 15% before leaving for a vacation in California.
- December 30 – President Nixon signs a tax reform bill into law, critiquing measures of the bill in an accompanying statement. President Nixon arrives in San Clemente, California and announces his intent to change his voting residence to the state instead of the current New York.
