= Naval Support Activity Saigon =

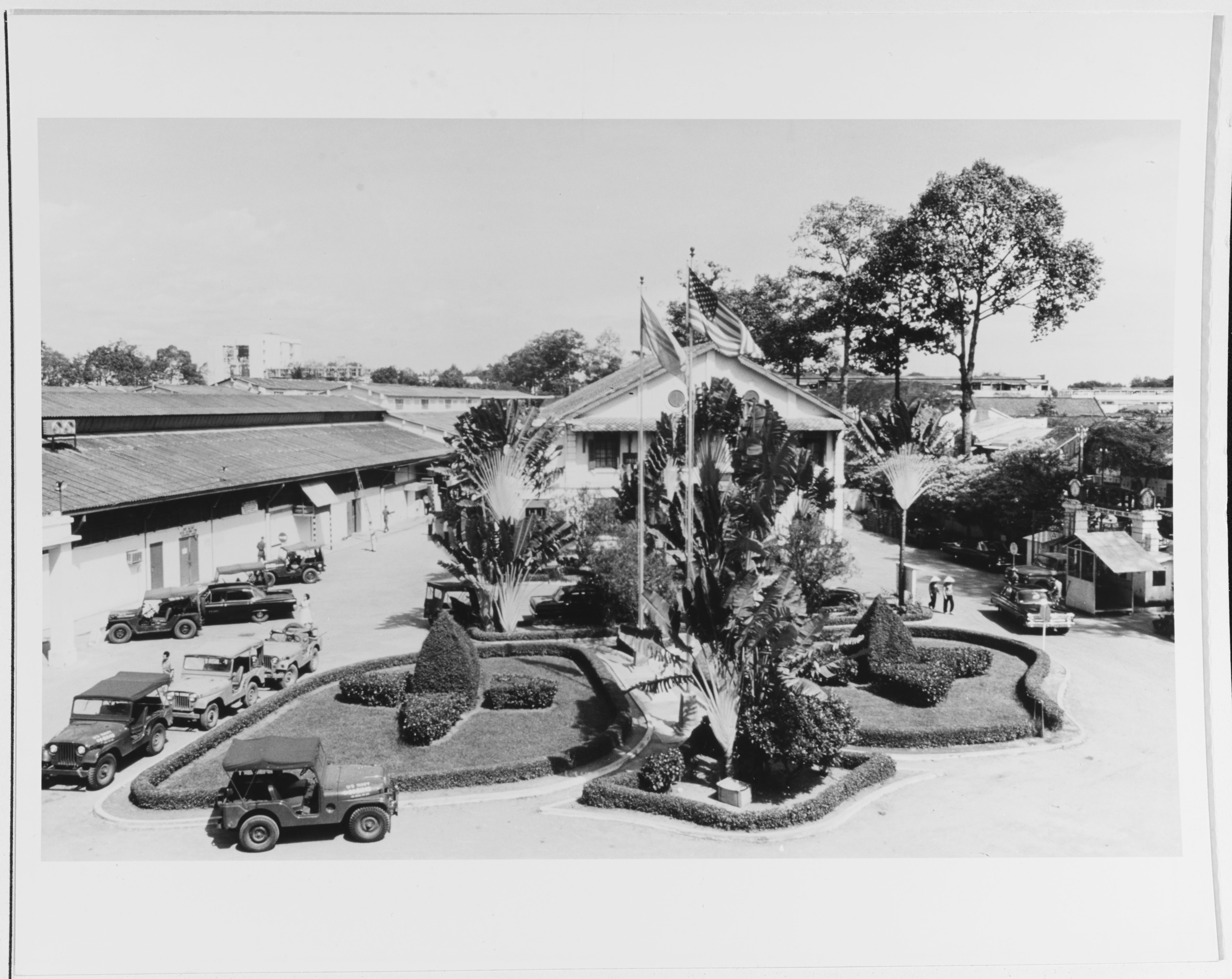
- Headquarters Support Activity, Saigon, 1966
- Active: 1966–1972
- Country: South Vietnam
- Branch: United States Navy
- Role: Logistics support
- Part of: Naval Forces Vietnam
- Garrison/HQ: Saigon, South Vietnam
- Battle honours: Vietnam War

Commanders
- Notable commanders: Archie C. Kuntze; Robert E. Adamson

Naval Support Activity Saigon or NSA Saigon was a United States Navy logistics support organization located in Saigon, South Vietnam active from May 1966 to June 1972.

== History ==
A logistics establishment already existed at Saigon when major U.S. forces came ashore in South Vietnam in 1965. The United States Navy's Headquarters Support Activity, Saigon (HSAS) was responsible for providing countrywide administrative and logistics support to the Military Assistance Advisory Group in South Vietnam. During a single month in 1965 the activity's Saigon port operation offloaded over 330,000 tons of cargo from 96 ships and transshipped 40,000 tons to other coastal centers. Throughout the year HSAS divisions acquired 2.7 million feet of storage space, managed 54 bachelor officer and enlisted quarters, oversaw 318 construction contracts, and distributed 60,000 books and magazines from the library to outlying bases. The Saigon Station Hospital's 109 medical personnel continued to treat thousands of patients.

In September 1965 HSAS gradually began turning over most of its responsibilities for common support of the other services to the United States Army’s new 1st Logistical Command with the final transfer taking place on 17 May 1966.

Naval Support Activity Saigon, which the Navy activated on 17 May 1966, was charged with providing logistic support to naval units in the II, III and IV Corps Tactical Zones. The newly created Naval Forces Vietnam (NAVFORV) directed the operations of NSA Saigon. The support activity supplied the Navy's Coastal Surveillance Force, River Patrol Force, Mobile Riverine Force and the various specialized headquarters, offices, and detachments operating in the three southern corps areas. NSA Saigon provided the commands with ammunition, weapons, and communications equipment; transported cargo and personnel; repaired and maintained ships and craft; stocked spare parts; and built bases and facilities. Finally, NSA saw to the quartering, messing, payroll, and recreational needs of the naval officers and enlisted personnel in South Vietnam.

NSA Saigon developed subordinate support bases for the combat forces with detachments at Quy Nhơn, Nha Trang, Cam Ranh Bay, An Thoi, Cat Lo and Vũng Tàu primarily serving Operation Market Time, although the last two bases were home to other naval combat units as well. The concentration of the Task Force 115 headquarters, naval air units, and other large contingents at Cam Ranh Bay required greater command authority and logistic resources. As a result, in September 1967, NSA Saigon upgraded the detachment to the Naval Support Facility, Cam Ranh Bay. Detachments were also established at Cần Thơ (and later moved to nearby Binh Thuy), Nhà Bè, Vĩnh Long, Sa Đéc, Mỹ Tho, Tân Châu and Long Xuyên. These units saw to the special needs of the Task Force 116 Patrol Boat, River (PBR) commands. The NSA Saigon, Detachment Đồng Tâm, supplied only the Mobile Riverine Force naval units.

To perform its work, NSA Saigon operated many logistic support vessels, including repair and maintenance ships USS Tutuila, USS Markab and USS Krishna; Landing Ship, Tanks; and barges used for berthing and messing personnel and for providing fuel, water, supplies, and repairs. The support activity also ran an air transportation service, nicknamed "Air Cofat" (the unit operated from a building once owned by the French Cofat cigarette company). The naval unit flew C-47, TC-45J, HU-16 and CH-46 aircraft from Tan Son Nhut Air Base.

By June 1967 NSA Saigon personnel numbered 1,952.

By mid-1968 NSA Saigon had developed its logistic support system to such a degree that naval combat operations were rarely constrained by the lack of supply. By August, the 2,500-man activity transported 6,000 to 8,000 tons of cargo each month by water to forces in the field. Air Cofat delivered another 300,000 to 400,000 pounds of supplies and 3,500 passengers. The repair and maintenance vessels kept the 487 in-country combat and support craft ready for operations throughout the southern corps areas and on the coast.

On 20 June 1972 NSA Saigon was disestablished.
