= Table tennis in China =

Pīngpāng qiú (Chinese: 乒乓球) is the official name for the sport of table tennis in China. Table tennis in China is regulated by the Chinese Table Tennis Association.

== International results ==
Chinese players have won the men's World Championship 60% of the time since 1959; in the women's competition, Chinese players have won all but two of the World Championships since 1971. At the 2008 Beijing Olympics, 2012 London Olympics, 2016 Rio Olympics and 2024 Paris Olympics, China won all possible gold medals.

== See also ==
- Sport in China
- China national table tennis team
- List of China table tennis squads at the Olympics
