= USS Laws =

Fletcher-class destroyer

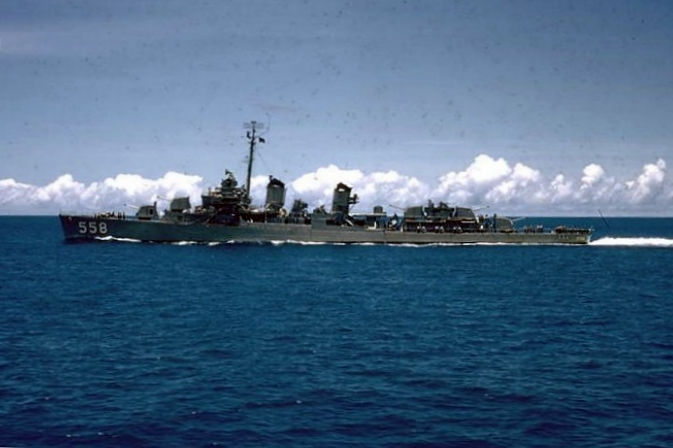
- USS Laws (DD-558)

History

United States
- Name: USS Laws
- Namesake: Alexander Laws
- Builder: Seattle-Tacoma Shipbuilding Corporation
- Laid down: 19 May 1942
- Launched: 22 April 1943
- Commissioned: 18 November 1943
- Decommissioned: 30 March 1964
- Stricken: 15 April 1973
- Fate: Sold for scrap, 3 December 1973

General characteristics
- Class & type: Fletcher-class destroyer
- Displacement: 2,050 tons
- Length: 376 ft 6 in (114.7 m)
- Beam: 39 ft 8 in (12.1 m)
- Draft: 17 ft 9 in (5.4 m)
- Propulsion: 60,000 shp (45 MW); 2 propellers
- Speed: 35 knots (65 km/h; 40 mph)
- Range: 6500 nmi. (12,000 km) @ 15 kt
- Complement: 273
- Armament: 5 × single Mk 12 5 in (127 mm)/38 guns; 5 × twin 40 mm (1.6 in) Bofors AA guns; 7 × single 20 mm (0.8 in) Oerlikon AA guns; 2 × quintuple 21 in (533 mm) torpedo tubes; 6 × single depth charge throwers; 2 × depth charge racks

USS Laws (DD-558), a Fletcher-class destroyer, was a ship of the United States Navy.

Laws was laid down on 19 May 1942 by Seattle-Tacoma Shipbuilding Corp., Seattle, Washington; launched on 22 April 1943, sponsored by Mrs. Mary A. Farwell; and commissioned on 18 November 1943.

== Naming ==
The ship was named for Alexander Laws, who served in the Navy during the Quasi-War and First Barbary War in the early 19th century. Laws was an American sailor commissioned as a midshipman on 15 May 1800, and served in the ship Ganges during the Quasi-War with France. Discharged under the Peace Establishment Act on 12 August 1801, he was again appointed midshipman on 25 August 1802. Initially assigned to the frigate Constitution, he volunteered to take part in the daring expedition under Lieutenant Stephen Decatur, Jr., to board the captured U.S. frigate Philadelphia, moored "within half gunshot of the Pasha's castle" in Tripoli harbor and put her to the torch.

On 16 February 1804, Decatur laid his command, the ketch Intrepid, alongside the captured frigate and, as Captain Edward Preble later wrote, "in a Gallant and Officer[-]like manner, boarded and carried her against all opposition…" Silence cloaked the bold American attack. "Not a musket or Pistol was fired on our side," Preble reported, "everything [was accomplished] by the sword and tomawhawk." Laws served under Lieutenant James Lawrence, who, with Midshipman Thomas Macdonough and ten men (all cautioned "to use firearms only in case of urgent necessity") seized Philadelphia's berth deck and forward storerooms. While the "Tripolines" suffered between 20 and 30 men killed in the action that Lord Horatio Nelson was said to have lauded as "the most daring act of the age," Decatur's force of 70 volunteers suffered only one man wounded in taking the ship to begin her destruction by fire.

After a stint of detached service in gunboats (26 August to 19 October 1804) during the siege of Tripoli, Laws was detached from the Constitution on 29 November 1804 and ordered to frigate Congress, wherein he performed the duty of master's mate. Returning to the United States on 5 December 1805 from Mediterranean service, he was furloughed to the merchant service on 15 August 1806. Ultimately appointed lieutenant on 8 January 1807, he resigned his commission, such being accepted on 13 April 1807.

== 1944 ==
After shakedown, Laws departed San Francisco on 11 February 1944, joining the advance forces at Kwajalein on 4 March. Following two weeks of antisubmarine training, the destroyer sailed on the 20th to screen a refueling group supporting the raids on Palau, Yap, and Ulithi. Laws continued screening operations for the next month, accompanying tankers as they replenished units during the Hollandia operation.

After a brief respite at Pearl Harbor, Laws arrived at Roi Island 8 June, to join a carrier group en route to Saipan. Reaching her destination on the 15th, she screened the carriers as they hurled heavy air strikes against the Mariana Islands. Two days later, enemy planes made a vain attempt to penetrate the screen and find the carriers. Laws' 5 inch guns threw up a deadly barrage of antiaircraft fire, splashing two enemy planes and assisting in the downing of another. The destroyer remained in the Saipan area on patrol and screening duty until mid-August.

Additional bases were needed as staging areas for ships and aircraft during the planned Leyte invasion; and the Palau Island group was selected. Sailing with the carrier group on 29 August, Laws stood by as the mighty force softened up the beaches for the upcoming assault. On 9 September the force turned its attention to the Philippines, launching air strikes against Mindanao. While en route to their target, friendly planes reported a Japanese force of 40 small craft off Sanco Point; two cruisers, Laws, and three other destroyers were sent to intercept the group.

The carrier aircraft had already started to attack when the cruiser-destroyer force arrived on the scene. The enemy proved no match for the Americans, as Laws and her sister ships launched a coordinated attack, wiping out the convoy. Laws continued screening carriers until arriving at Ulithi on 1 October.

At sea again on 6 October, she joined the carriers as they struck Formosa and Okinawa before arriving off Leyte two weeks later. Laws remained offshore giving close support to 20 October invasion of Leyte. Since American occupation of the Philippines would cut squarely across enemy supply lines from the East Indies to the home islands, the Japanese could be expected to strike back at the invasion with their entire fleet.

Planes from Carrier Task Force 38 (TF 38), to which Laws was attached, located the Japanese Center Force on 24 October as the enemy steamed toward San Bernardino Strait; strikes from the carriers sank the battleship Musashi in the ensuing Battle of the Sibuyan Sea. As American bombers and torpedo planes punished other enemy ships of the Center Force, Admiral William F. Halsey, Jr.'s search planes scouted the seas in quest of enemy carriers. When they spotted Admiral Jisaburo Ozawa's force toward mid-afternoon, Laws raced north with the carriers to intercept. Reaching striking range during the early hours next morning and shortly after dawn, the carriers launched planes to begin a day-long pounding that sank four carriers and a destroyer.

Meanwhile, the Japanese suffered other crippling defeats at Surigao Strait and off Samar. When the last smoke from these momentous engagements—collectively known as the Battle of Leyte Gulf—had cleared, Japan had all but lost its Imperial Navy, the Philippines, and all hope of winning the war. As the Japanese Navy Minister, Admiral Mitsumasa Yonai, reflected after the close of hostilities "...defeat at Leyte was tantamount to the loss of the Philippines. When you took the Philippines, that was the end of our resources."

== 1945 ==
Laws continued to screen the carriers as they conducted strikes against Japanese forces on Leyte and Luzon for the rest of the year. Sailing with the carriers late in December, she supported the amphibious assault on Luzon on 6 January 1945. Bringing destruction closer to Tokyo, her task group next concentrated raids on the China coast and Formosa before replenishing at Ulithi.

Departing 10 February, Laws joined a destroyer radar picket unit set up to give the carrier forces early warning of enemy attacks. On the 19th, she screened the flattops as they struck Iwo Jima, a volcanic island fortress needed for a B-29 airstrip. After supporting the invasion campaign until success was assured, Laws retired to Ulithi on 12 March.

Preparations for the invasion of Okinawa, the last remaining barrier on the road to Japan, were now complete. Laws departed Ulithi on 21 March, as part of Task Force 54 (TF 54), to take up patrol station in advance of the planned 1 April invasion. Providing support for minesweeping operations and underwater demolition teams, the veteran destroyer proved her value. The Allies, sweeping down on the enemy, planted a garrison in Japan's backyard, as Laws stood by on patrol and shore bombardment. On 6 April she splashed a Zeke as it made its way toward the fleet. The destroyer remained off Okinawa until the island was declared secure, and continued operations in its vicinity for the rest of the war.

With the cessation of hostilities with Japan's surrender, Laws departed Ulithi on 7 September, and arrived Bremerton, Washington, on 15 September. Later that year she steamed to San Diego, California, where she remained until decommissioning on 10 December 1946.

== 1951 – 1964 ==
When the need arose for additional ships to support the Korean War, Laws was recommissioned on 2 November 1951 at the Long Beach Naval Shipyard. After a year of modernization and hunter-killer training operations, the destroyer departed San Diego on 13 November 1952 for service in the Far East. Arriving at Yokosuka, Japan, three days before Christmas of 1952, Laws joined TF 77 four days later, and headed for the east coast of Korea. During January 1953 the destroyer remained off the coast to screen carriers engaged in raids on the peninsula.

On 19 February, Laws proceeded independently to Nando Island, where she bombarded the shore, supporting the ROK 15th Division by silencing two enemy shore emplacements on 6 March. She continued operations in support of American forces in Korea until late May when she sailed to patrol off Formosa. Laws completed her Far East tour early in July and arrived at San Diego on 20 July.

Operating on a tactical training schedule for the next seven months, the destroyer departed on her second Western Pacific (WestPac) cruise on 3 March 1954. She joined the Seventh Fleet in peacekeeping operations and during the summer remained on alert to support the Chinese Nationalist positions in the Tachen Islands. Laws returned to San Diego on 12 September and resumed training operations off the west coast for the rest of the year. From 1955 through 1957 Laws made annual cruises to the Far East to operate with the Seventh Fleet, including Taiwan patrol and training exercises.

On 1 July 1958, Laws was assigned to Reserve Escort Division 12 and commenced service as a training ship. She continued reserve cruises along the coast from Mazatlán, Mexico, to Canada until 2 February 1962 when she sailed on another WestPac cruise. While in the Far East, Laws exercised with the Korean and Nationalist Chinese Navy and remained on the alert during the Laotian crisis.

== Fate ==
Returning San Francisco on 17 July 1962, the destroyer resumed operations as a Naval Reserve training ship and continued in this capacity until she was decommissioned at Mare Island Naval Shipyard, Vallejo, California, on 30 March 1964. She was assigned to Reserve Destroyer Division 271, Mare Island Group, on 1 April 1964.

Laws was stricken from the Naval Vessel Register on 15 April 1973, and was sold to American Ship Dismantlers, Inc., of Portland, Oregon, on 3 December 1973. She was transferred to the buyer on 28 December 1973 to be broken up for scrap.

== Honors ==
Laws received nine battle stars for World War II service and two stars for Korean War service.

USS Laws can be seen briefly in TV's Kraft Suspense Theatre episode: "Streetcar, do you Read Me?" as position ship alpha.

== Notable crew members ==
- John W. Young - Astronaut, one of 12 to walk on the Moon - served as Fire Control Officer on the USS Laws until June 1953 - completed a tour in the Korean Seas
