= 1st Theater Sustainment Command =

- 1st Sustainment Command shoulder sleeve insignia
- Founded: 1950
- Country: United States
- Branch: United States Army
- Type: Theater Sustainment Command
- Part of: United States Army Central
- Garrison/HQ: Fort Knox, Kentucky; FWD HQ, Camp Arifjan, Kuwait
- Motto: First Team
- Mascot: SSG Jack "Huck" Blackjack
- Engagements: Vietnam War; Operation Urgent Fury; Operation Just Cause; Operation Desert Shield/Desert Storm; Operation Iraqi Freedom; Operation Enduring Freedom; Operation New Dawn; Humanitarian assistance (Pakistan)

Commanders
- Current commander: Major General John B. Hinson

Insignia
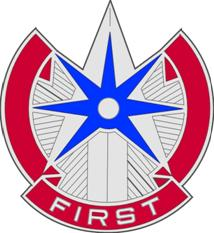
- Distinctive unit insignia

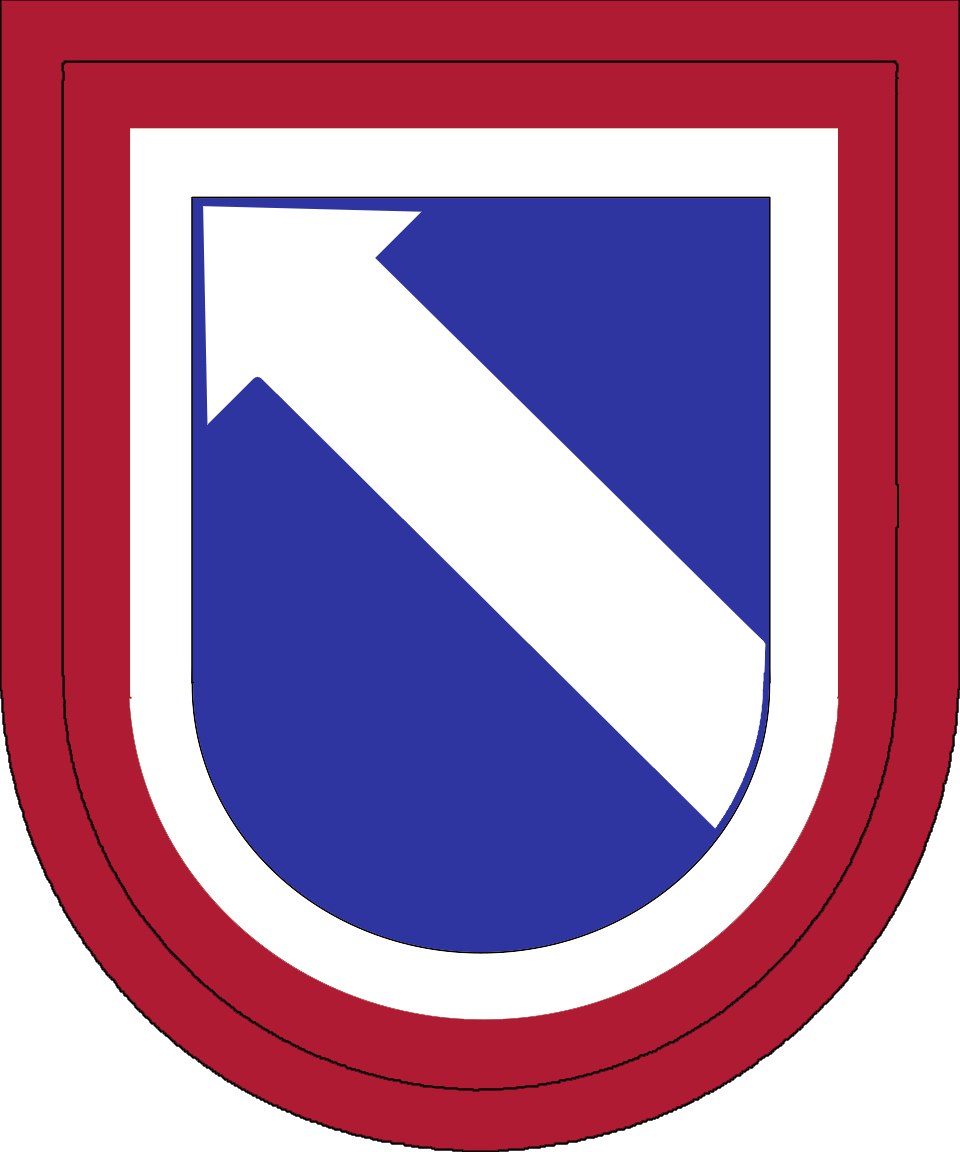
- Former unit beret flash

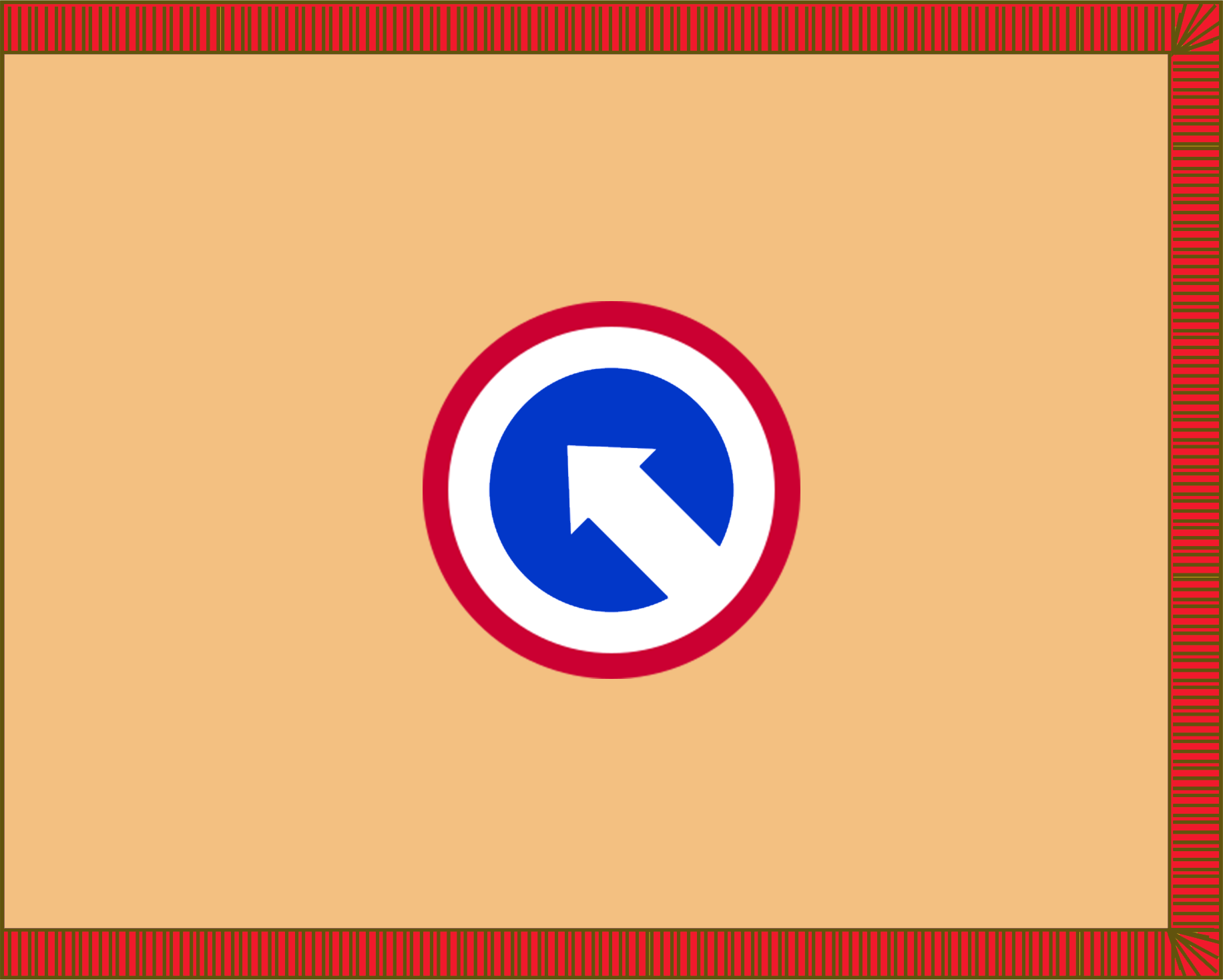
- 1st Sustainment Command Flag

The 1st Theater Sustainment Command (1st TSC) is a major subordinate unit of United States Army Central at Fort Knox, Kentucky, United States.

== History ==
The 1st Logistical Command was activated as a planning headquarters in October 1950 at Fort McPherson, Georgia.

During the Berlin Crisis of 1961, the new unit deployed to France to organize the base Logistics Command, which was responsible for the supervision of seven depots and area port operations in western and southwestern France. On August 11, 1962, the 1st Logistical Command returned to the United States where it was reassigned to III Corps at Fort Hood, Texas. Once at Fort Hood, the 1st Logistical Command resumed training and participated in a wide range of logistical missions.

== Vietnam War ==
=== Background ===
As early as 1962, the need for a centralized U.S. logistical organization in South Vietnam was foreseen by Commander U.S. Military Assistance Advisory Group, Vietnam, Lieutenant General Paul D. Harkins. The proposal was disapproved, however by Commander in Chief, United States Army Pacific and Commander in Chief Pacific, who felt that the requirement was not justified at that time.

The idea was revived in August 1964 by the Military Assistance Command, Vietnam (MACV) J-4 (Logistics), who believed that the current and future situation would require a logistical command to support activities in South Vietnam. Accordingly, he saw that a plan was prepared which included the prompt introduction of a logistical construction capability. On 21 December 1964, the Joint Chiefs of Staff endorsed the MACV plan and recommended that 230 men be initially dispatched to South Vietnam to form a logistical command as soon as possible. Secretary of Defense Robert S. McNamara approved the plan in principle, but stated that additional justification was needed, particularly for the engineer construction group. However, he felt that the subject was of sufficient importance to send a special representative to South Vietnam and on 31 January 1965, a group from the Office of the Secretary of Defense arrived in Saigon. After four days of conferences, this group recommended the establishment of a logistical command with an initial strength of 350 men. The establishment of an engineer construction group, not recommended initially, was approved in April as planning for a further buildup developed.

On 25 February 1965 McNamara approved the introduction of a logistical planning group in South Vietnam consisting of 17 officers and 21 enlisted men. Colonel Robert W. Duke was en route to take command of the 9th Logistical Command in Thailand. He was intercepted in Hawaii and ordered to South Vietnam to take charge of the planning group. He arrived in Saigon on 6 March 1965. The balance of the officers and enlisted men for the planning group arrived in Saigon during the last two weeks of March 1965. On 1 April 1965, the 1st Logistical Command was activated in Saigon by Commander in Chief U.S. Army Pacific General Order, using the personnel of the logistical planning group as its initial strength.

Prior to this time logistical support in South Vietnam had been fragmented, with the Army providing only Class II and IV items which were peculiar to the Army, Class V items used by the Army aviation units and maintenance of vehicles, armament, and instrument calibration by a small Direct Support shop in Saigon. The rest of the support was provided by the United States Navy through Headquarters Support Activity, Saigon because the Navy had been designated as the executive agency responsible for supporting the Military Assistance and Advisory Groups and missions in Southeast Asia.

The mission of the 1st Logistical Command was, in broad terms that it would assume responsibility for all logistical support in South Vietnam, less that which was peculiar to the United States Air Force or Navy. This initial mission included procurement, medical, construction, engineer, finance and accounting of all U.S. Army forces in-country except MACV advisors; and excluded communications, aviation, and military police support which were retained by United States Army Vietnam (USARV) (the Army component command under MACV and over the 1st Logistical Command). Requirements beyond direct support and general support maintenance capability were to be retrograded to Okinawa. Subsequent add-on missions were planned to be put into effect as the capability became available. These add-on missions were to: assume support of MACV advisors from Headquarters Commandant, MACV, a task accomplished on 1 September 1965, phase out the Navy supply activity in Saigon, the 1st Logistical Command started assuming Headquarters Support Activity Saigon functions in September 1965 and completed the mission in March 1966 and assumed common item support for all U.S. forces in South Vietnam.

=== Organization ===
The 1st Logistical Command, in coordination with MACV operational planning, developed its own logistic concept for South Vietnam. The plan provided for two major base depots and five support commands. The seas and rivers were initially to be the main supply routes within South Vietnam. However, a changeover to road and rail would take place when the tactical situation permitted. Each support command would provide all logistic support on an area basis and have a 15-day stockage. Depots would have a 45-day stockage. The Saigon Depot would support the Vũng Tàu and Cần Thơ Support Commands. The Cam Ranh Bay Depot would support the Nha Trang, Qui Nhơn and Da Nang Support Commands.

A two depot concept was considered essential due to the vulnerability of the Saigon River and port to Viet Cong (VC) action and the limited port capacity. Vũng Tàu was considered an alternative to the Saigon port in the event of loss of Saigon or blockage of the Saigon River. Cam Ranh Bay was selected as the other base depot and port due to its excellent deep water harbor, the existing pier, its central location and U.S. capability to secure the area from VC attack.

This plan by the 1st Logistical Command was implemented with only two changes: the United States Marine Corps were landed at Da Nang and, by Commander in Chief Pacific direction, the Navy was given the responsibility for both tactical and logistical operations in I Corps and this was administered by Naval Support Activity Danang. The Da Nang Support Command was eliminated from the 1st Logistical Command plan. The anticipated scale of tactical operations in the Mekong Delta area of IV Corps did not materialize, so the Cần Thơ Support Command was not activated and IV Corps was supported by the Vũng Tàu Support Command by sea and air.

From 1966 to 1972, the 593d General Support Group participated in 14 campaigns as HQ Qui Nhon Sub Area Command. The 593rd General Support Group earning its second Meritorious Unit Commendation and the Vietnamese Cross of Gallantry with Palm in this process.

The original plan for the refinement of a logistical plan in an orderly fashion followed by a deliberate and orderly implementation never came to pass. Instead it quickly turned into a concurrent planning and implementation process. U.S. forces in South Vietnam were built up in an imbalanced manner. Continued enemy pressure on the beleaguered government of South Vietnam and manpower ceilings combined to cause the logistics base to be inadequate in relation to the total force level. Numerous changes were made in tactical plans in the initial stages of the buildup due to VC pressure. Such changes were necessary, but had an adverse effect on orderly logistical planning and implementation. As logistical units arrived in South Vietnam they were assigned to appropriate depots or Support Commands as the tactical situation demanded.

It was recognized that the continued influx of troops into Saigon would soon exceed its capability to absorb them and that usable real estate and facilities were not available in the Saigon area. The command was tasked with developing a short range plan to absorb the influx of troops and a long range plan that would ultimately move the bulk of U.S. Army personnel out of the Saigon area. A thorough reconnaissance was made and the Long Binh area was selected for the establishment of a major logistical and administrative base. A master base development plan was prepared which provided areas for all activities in Saigon. General William Westmoreland (who was both MACV commander and Commanding General USARV) was briefed on the study and approved it in principle, except he elected to move Headquarters, USARV to Long Binh Post (Headquarters MACV, remained in the Saigon area). The command immediately began implementing the study by locating the ammunition depot, hospital, engineers, plus direct support and general support supply and maintenance support at Long Binh. The movement of headquarters activities was delayed by the requirement for $2 million to develop an adequate communication system in the area and by the time required for installation of the system. Long Binh Post eventually became the Army's largest installation in South Vietnam.

In July 1965, the decision was made to deploy an engineer brigade to South Vietnam, and upon its arrival the engineer construction functions were transferred from the command to the Engineer Brigade. The 44th Medical Brigade became operational in May 1966 and assumed the command's medical services and supply function.

With the increase of Army forces in I Corps from early 1968 and the progressive reduction of Marine forces there in 1969, the command began to take over the logistics function there with the Army assuming full control by July 1970.

In 1970 the command was merged into USARV and on 15 June the command was disestablished.

== Late 20th Century ==
On 22 June 1972, the command was re-designated the 1st Corps Support Command (COSCOM) and reassigned to the XVIII Airborne Corps, Fort Bragg, North Carolina. From 1972 until 2006, it deployed multiple times in support of disaster relief missions and Operations Operation Urgent Fury (1983); the United States invasion of Panama - "Operation Just Cause" (1989); the Gulf War ("Desert Shield/Desert Storm") (1990-March–April 1991); Joint Task Force Andrew to support South Florida after being devastated by Hurricane Andrew (August 1992-October 1992), Operation Restore Hope regarding support to United Nations efforts in Somalia (1993); Haiti with Uphold Democracy (1994); and Provide Refuge (1999).

== Current role ==
The 1st Theater Sustainment Command (TSC) provides mission command and anticipatory operational-level sustainment support to Army, Joint, Interagency, and Multinational Forces; resets the theater, and conducts theater security cooperation within the USCENTCOM Area of Operations in order to enable unified land operations in support of combatant command directives.

The command maintains a headquarters in Fort Knox, Kentucky, while sustaining an enduring mission forward, based in Kuwait.

Subordinate units serving under the 1st TSC include:

- 12th Finance Operations Center (Ft Knox)
- 14th Human Resources Sustainment Center (Ft Knox)
- 1st TSC Special Troops Battalion (Ft Knox*)
- Task Force Sinai, Multinational Force and Observers (TACON)
- 135th Expeditionary Sustainment Command

== Command group ==
- Commanding General BG John B. Hinson
- Command Sergeant Major CSM Adam T. Lepley
- Deputy Commanding General BG Peter L. Gilbert
- Chief of Staff COL Clydea Prichard-Brown
- Deputy Commanding Officer COL Anthony P. Marante

== List of commanders ==
Image	Rank	Name	Branch	Begin date	End date	Notes
	Colonel	Robert W. Duke		1 April 1965	1 January 1966	
	Major General	Charles W. Eifler		1 January 1966	12 June 1967	
	Major General	Shelton E. Lollis		12 June 1967	11 August 1967	
	Major General	Thomas H. Scott Jr.		11 August 1967	1 August 1968	
	Major General	Joseph M. Heiser Jr.		1 August 1968	22 August 1969	
	Brigadier General	Hugh A. Richeson		22 August 1969	1 September 1969	
	Major General	Walter J. Woolwine		1 September 1969	26 June 1970	
	Brigadier General	Kevin A. Leonard		18 April 2006	28 August 2008	
	Major General	James E. Rogers		28 August 2008	15 July 2010	
	Major General	Kenneth S. Dowd		15 July 2010	2 July 2012	
	Major General	Kurt J. Stein		12 July 2012	31 January 2014	
	Major General	Darrell K. Williams		31 January 2014	3 August 2015	
	Major General	Paul C. Hurley Jr.		3 August 2015	2 July 2017	
	Major General	Flem B. Walker Jr.		2 July 2017	2 July 2019	
	Major General	John P. Sullivan		2 July 2019	13 July 2021	
	Major General	Michel M. Russell Sr.		13 July 2021	23 June 2023	
	Major General	Eric P. Shirley		23 June 2023	June 2025	
	Major General	John B. Hinson		June 2025	Present	

== Decorations ==
Operation Freedom's Sentinel
Inherent Resolve
Spartan Shield
Resolve Support

- Meritorious Unit Commendation 2016–2019

Operation Desert Shield/Storm

- Meritorious Unit Commendation Aug 15, 1990 to Mar 15, 1991 https://www.hrc.army.mil/content/Unit%20Award% (References: AR 600-8-22 & AR 670-1)

Operation Iraqi Freedom

- Meritorious Unit Commendation 2007

Vietnam

- Meritorious Unit Commendation Streamer Embroidered Vietnam 1965
- Meritorious Unit Commendation Streamer Embroidered Vietnam 1966
- Meritorious Unit Commendation Streamer Embroidered Vietnam 1967–1968
- Meritorious Unit Commendation Streamer Embroidered Vietnam 1968–1970
- Meritorious Unit Commendation Streamer Embroidered Southwest Asia 2004–2005; 2009–2010

== Campaign participation credit ==
Vietnam

- Defense
- Counteroffensive
- Counteroffensive, Phase II
- Counteroffensive, Phase III
- Tet Counteroffensive
- Counteroffensive, Phase IV
- Counteroffensive, Phase V
- Counteroffensive, Phase VI
- Tet 69/Counteroffensive
- Summer-fall 1969
- Winter-spring 1970
- Sanctuary Counteroffensive
- Counteroffensive, Phase VII

Armed Forces Expeditions

- Operation Urgent Fury Grenada (1983)
- Operation Just Cause Panama (1989 - 1990)
- Operation Restore Hope Somalia (1993)
- Operation Uphold Democracy Haiti (1994)
- Operation Provide Refuge Kosovo (1999)

Southwest Asia

- Defense of Saudi Arabia
- Liberation and Defense of Kuwait
- Cease-Fire
- Operation Provide Comfort I & II
- Operation Enduring Freedom
- Operation Iraqi Freedom
- Operation Inherent Resolve
- Operation Freedom's Sentinel
- Operation Spartan Shield
- Operation Resolute Support
- Operation Enduring Sentinel

== Humanitarian Missions ==
- Hurricane Hugo Disaster Relief (Sep. 1989)
- Joint Task Force Andrew Hurricane Andrew Disaster, S. Florida (August 1992)
