= Centers for Disease Control and Prevention timeline =

Events involving US public health governance

The Centers for Disease Control and Prevention (CDC), formed in 1946, is the leading national public health institute of the United States. It is a United States federal agency, under the United States Department of Health and Human Services. Its main goal is to protect public health and safety through the control and prevention of disease, injury, and disability in the US and internationally.

== 1940s ==
- 1946 – The Communicable Disease Center is organized in Atlanta, Georgia, on July 1
- 1947 – In San Francisco, CDC took over the Public Health Service Plague Laboratory, thus acquiring an Epidemiology Division.
- 1948 – CDC gained worldwide recognition for the quality and quantity of its contributions to the taxonomy of the Enterobacteriaceae.
- 1949 – As a result of the Cold War, CDC initiated programs to fight biological warfare, "an exotic new threat to health."

== 1950s ==
- 1950 – Fifteen CDC staffers conducted the first investigation of an epidemic of polio in Paulding County, Ohio.
- 1951 – The Epidemic Intelligence Service was established to help protect against biological warfare and manmade epidemics.
- 1952 – Surgeon General Dr. Leonard A. Scheele reported that the Communicable Disease Center was ready to combat possible biological warfare.
- 1953 – CDC reported first case of rabies in a bat.
- 1954 – Alexander D. Langmuir, M.D., M.P.H., set up a leptospirosis laboratory in Jacksonville, Florida.
- 1955 – CDC established the Polio Surveillance Program.
- 1956 – Dr. William Cherry found the first practical use for the fluorescent technique, which was successful in identifying pathogens that might be used in biological warfare.
- 1957 – National guidelines for influenza vaccine were developed.
- 1958 – A CDC team traveled overseas, for the first time, to Southeast Asia to respond to an epidemic of cholera and smallpox.
- 1959 – Dr. Robert Kissling developed the fluorescent antibody test for rabies, first used in a field trial with 100 percent accuracy.

== 1960s ==
- 1960 – The Tuberculosis Program moved from the Public Health Service to CDC.
- 1961 – CDC took over publication of Morbidity and Mortality Weekly Report (MMWR).
- 1962 – CDC played a key role in one of the greatest triumphs of public health: the eradication of smallpox.
- 1963 – CDC tested the newly developed jet injector vaccine for smallpox.
- 1964 – The first Surgeon General's report linking smoking to lung cancer was released. It stated that "cigarette smoking is a health hazard of sufficient importance in the United States to warrant appropriate remedial action."
- 1965 – New surveillance systems added to the original National Surveillance Program of 1952 included measles, shigellosis, tetanus, and trichinosis.
- 1966 – CDC announced a national measles eradication campaign at the American Public Health Association meeting.
- 1967 – The Foreign Quarantine Service, one of the oldest and most prestigious units of the Public Health Service, joined CDC.
- 1968 – CDC investigated an unidentified, highly infectious respiratory disease in Pontiac, Michigan, later identified as Legionellosis (also known by its two forms, Legionnaires' disease and Pontiac fever).
- 1969 – CDC constructed a "biocontainment lab" to protect scientists while they work with deadly and infectious pathogens.

== 1970s ==
- 1970 – The Communicable Disease Center became the Center for Disease Control.
- 1971 – The National Center for Health Statistics conducted the first National Health and Nutrition Examination Survey, taking a snapshot of the health status of Americans.
- 1972 – Tuskegee Study of Untreated Syphilis in the Negro Male was brought to public attention.
- 1973 – The National Institute for Occupational Safety and Health (NIOSH) is transferred into CDC. It had been created in its present form through the December 29, 1970 Occupational Safety and Health Act, and its direct predecessor organization, the Division of Industrial Hygiene, dated back to 1914.
- 1973 – Morbidity and Mortality Weekly Report (MMWR) reported that emissions of lead in residential areas constitute a public health threat, contrary to popular assumption at the time.
- 1974 – CDC planned a major campaign to reverse the downward trend in the number of Americans immunized.
- 1975 – The last victim of variola major smallpox, the more severe form of the disease, was reported.
- 1976 – CDC investigated two outbreaks of a previously unknown deadly hemorrhagic fever, later known as Ebola, in Zaire and Sudan.
- 1977 – Global eradication of smallpox was achieved.
- 1978 – Alcorn County, Mississippi, reported cases of the first outbreak of tuberculosis resistance to previously effective drugs.
- 1979 – First Healthy People report published.

== 1980s ==
- 1980 – Morbidity and Mortality Weekly Report published the first report on the newly recognized toxic shock syndrome, an illness associated with tampon use.
- 1981 – The first diagnosis of the fatal disease later known as AIDS was described in the June 5, 1981, issue of MMWR.
- 1982 – CDC advised of the possible risk of Reye syndrome associated with the use of aspirin by children with chickenpox and flu-like symptoms.
- 1983 – CDC established a Violence Epidemiology Branch to apply public health prevention strategies to child abuse, homicide, and suicide.
- 1984 – CDC studied Vietnam veterans who were exposed to Agent Orange during combat and later fathered babies; no increased risk of birth defects was found.
- 1985 – With other government organizations, CDC sponsored the first International AIDS Conference, which took place in Atlanta.
- 1986 – The Office on Smoking and Health, which targets the nation's primary preventable health problem, became part of CDC.
- 1987 – The National Center for Health Statistics is transferred into CDC. Its earliest predecessor was created in 1899.
- 1987 – CDC reported that about 7,000 workers die on the job annually; 42 percent of female workers who die on the job are murdered.
- 1988 – CDC established the National Center for Chronic Disease Prevention and Health Promotion.
- 1989 – CDC reported the 100,000th AIDS case in the United States.

== 1990s ==
- 1990 – For the first time, CDC reported the possible transmission of HIV from a dentist to a patient in Florida during an invasive procedure.
- 1991 – A CDC study showed that one in five teen deaths is gun-related, and firearm death rates for male teens exceeded those for all natural causes of death.
- 1992 – The National Academy of Sciences reported on a dangerous new phenomenon: the emergence of new and virulent diseases that are resistant to antibiotics.
- 1993 – CDC reported that 200,000 Americans had died of AIDS since the epidemic began.
- 1994 – CDC published a frank brochure on how condoms reduce the transmission of the AIDS virus.
- 1995 – CDC recommended offering HIV testing to all pregnant women.
- 1996 – CDC, in partnership with the International Society for Travel Medicine, initiated the GeoSentinel surveillance network to improve travel medicine.
- 1997 – CDC participated in the nationally televised White House event of the Presidential Apology for the Tuskegee Study.
- 1998 – For the first time since 1981, AIDS was diagnosed in more African-American and Hispanic men than in gay white men.
- 1999 – CDC's Laboratory Response Network was established.

== 2000s ==
- 2000 – CDC identified an outbreak of HIV-related tuberculosis among young transgender people in New York and Boston.
- 2001 – CDC learned of the first of the 2001 anthrax attacks.
- 2002 – CDC reported that U.S. newborn HIV infections were down 80 percent since 1981.
- 2003 – Severe acute respiratory syndrome (SARS) was first reported in Asia. CDC provided guidance for surveillance, clinical and laboratory evaluation, and reporting.
- 2004 – CDC provided support for laws restricting access to over-the-counter medications used in methamphetamine production in Georgia.
- 2005 – Rubella was eliminated in the United States.
- 2006 – CDC celebrates its 60th anniversary.
- 2006 – CDC awarded "$5.2 million to evaluate community strategies to reduce impact of pandemic influenza."
- 2007 – CDC published their report, which introduced a series of brochures targeted at specific groups, such as the Pandemic Influenza Community Mitigation Interim Planning Guide for Individuals and Families. The report was produced in collaboration with dozens of federal agencies. It introduced concepts such as "cough etiquette", "early, targeted, and layered nonpharmaceutical interventions (NPIs)", "hand hygiene", "nonpharmaceutical intervention (NPI)", and "social distancing". In the report's introduction, a chart illustrates how expanding "medical surge capacity", "reducing the anticipated demand for services", and "limiting disease transmission" can delay a "rapid upswing of cases" and lower the "epidemic peak". This would "allow a better match between the number of ill persons requiring hospitalization and the nation's capacity to provide medical care for such people." This chart was shared on social media in March 2020 during the COVID-19 pandemic.

== 2010s ==
- 2013 – CDC releases first report to categorize threats by hazard level.
- 2014 – CDC established a Modeling Task Force capable of generating estimates of risk for importation of cases of Ebola from West African countries like Mali to the United States.

== 2020s ==
- 2025 – CDC's Roybal Campus is attacked by a gunman who kills a local police officer and strikes four CDC buildings over 180 times.

== See also ==
- Louis L. Williams
