= Commander, Naval Forces Vietnam =

U.S. Naval forces during the Vietnam War

U.S. Naval Forces, Vietnam
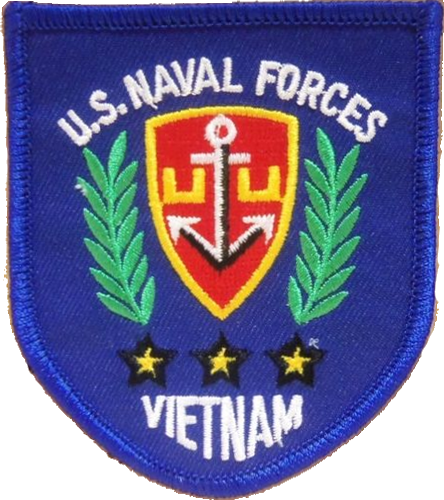
- U.S. Naval Forces, Vietnam insignia
- Active: 1 April 1966 – 29 March 1973
- Part of: United States Navy
- Garrison/HQ: Saigon, South Vietnam
- Engagements: Vietnam War

Commanders
- Notable commanders: Norvell G. Ward; Kenneth L. Veth; Elmo Zumwalt; Jerome H. King; Robert Salzer

Insignia
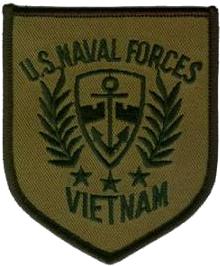
- Patch (subdued)

The U.S. Naval Forces, Vietnam was a command of the United States Navy, active during the Vietnam War, from 1 April 1966 to 29 March 1973.

COMNAVFORV also commanded the Naval Advisory Group and the Seabees of the 3rd Naval Construction Brigade; the Military Sea Transportation Service Office, Vietnam, which coordinated the enormous sealift to Southeast Asia; the Officer in Charge of Construction, Vietnam (OICC-RVN), who managed in-country construction by civilian contractors; the Naval Research and Development Unit, Vietnam, which tested new equipment in the field; and Commander Coast Guard Activities, Vietnam, which provided administrative support for Coast Guard Squadron One, Coast Guard Squadron Three and other smaller Coast Guard units in-country.

Commanders included Rear Admiral Norvell G. Ward (to 27 April 1967), Rear Admiral Kenneth L. Veth (to 30 September 1968), who was then succeeded by newly promoted Vice Admiral Elmo Zumwalt. Rear Admiral Ward became Commander Service Group 3 in Seventh Fleet after departing South Vietnam. Zumwalt was succeeded by Vice Admirals Jerome H. King and Robert S. Salzer.

== History ==
On 3 August 1950 the first elements of the planned U.S. Military Assistance Advisory Group (MAAG), Indochina arrived in Saigon to assist France in retaining control of its Indochinese possessions from the attacks by the Communist Viet Minh. The MAAG was officially stood up on 27 September 1950. The MAAG's Navy Section was initially assigned eight officers and men that were tasked with processing naval material for delivery to the French forces. The first shipment arrived in October 1950, consisting of Grumman F6F Hellcat fighters. Over the next four years, the Navy Section oversaw the delivery of US$2.6 billion in aid including two aircraft carriers, 438 amphibious landing ships and craft, armored river patrol craft and other vessels and 500 aircraft. The Navy Section of MAAG also was responsible for supplying spare parts for ships and aircraft as well as the establishment of base facilities in Saigon and Haiphong harbors.

After the defeat of the French forces at the Battle of Dien Bien Phu on 7 May 1954 by the Viet Minh, the Navy Section of MAAG coordinated the evacuation of hundreds of thousands of Vietnamese on ships of the Seventh Fleet. The Geneva Agreements of 1954 specified that any Vietnamese or ethnic Chinese living north of the 17th parallel north could if they chose, move to the south part of the partition of Vietnam. The movement named Operation Passage to Freedom lasted from August 1954 to 18 May 1955 and required hundreds of U.S. Navy and Military Sea Transport Service ships (partially provided by Task Force 90). Also transported were 8,135 French military vehicles and 68,757 tons of cargo. The Navy Section of the MAAG was responsible for adequate port facilities in the south half of the newly partitioned county to receive the ships transporting displaced refugees.

Upon the departure of the French in 1955, the U.S. became directly involved with the Vietnamese government in the south partition and MAAG, Vietnam (MAAGV) was established. Restrictions set down in the Geneva Agreements limited the number of military personnel that could be in South Vietnam at any one time. From 1955 to 1959 there were never more than 79 naval advisors in country. The Navy Section MAAG advisors were responsible for training the Republic of Vietnam Navy (RVNN) and Marine Corps and providing material assistance. Additionally, they evaluated new weapons, boats, and equipment that were being developed for use by the RVNN.

In 1959, North Vietnam began a long-term campaign to overthrow the South Vietnamese government through political subversion and armed conflict. As the actions of the North Vietnamese-backed Viet Cong intensified, MAAG, Vietnam was called upon to provide even more training assistance to the South Vietnamese armed forces. The Navy Section of MAAGV increased their strength from 79 to 164 by 1964. Navy Section MAAGV advisors began accompanying the RVNN's River Assault Groups on combat missions in the field during this period. Additionally, a small group of Navy Section MAAGV personnel served on the newly formed Military Assistance Command Vietnam (MACV) after it was formed on 8 February 1962. MAAGV and its Naval Section was disestablished and absorbed by MACV on 15 May 1964. The Naval Advisory Group (NAG) of MACV assumed the responsibilities of the old Naval Section. At the end of 1964 there were 235 sailors assigned to MACV duties which included support functions in the Saigon area, construction and medical activities, and advising the South Vietnamese Navy and the marine corps.

=== Establishment ===
The vast, continuing increase in U.S. and allied military forces in South Vietnam in 1965 and 1966 brought with it a corresponding increase in United States Navy forces. The first operational U.S. Navy units began operations on 24 March 1965 with the establishment of the Vietnam Patrol Force (Commander, Task Force 71), which was under the operational control of the Seventh Fleet and was the American component of Operation Market Time. On 30 July, Task Force 71 was deactivated and operational control was shifted to Commander, Task Force 115, which was part of the Naval Advisory Group of MACV in Saigon. Market Time continued, with the addition of U.S. Navy surveillance aircraft, high speed PCF (Swift) coastal patrol boats, and U.S. Coast Guard Point-class cutters.

Late 1965 saw planning for the second major influx of operational U.S. Navy units. Operation Game Warden, designed to supplement RVNN units in patrol of the Mekong Delta and Rung Sat Special Zone waterways, was to come into operation on 18 December 1966 and designated as Task Force 116. High-speed River Patrol Boats (PBRs) were assigned as the principal patrol vessels.

With these operations came the requirement for the construction of new facilities. Navy Civil Engineer Corps personnel, assigned to the Officer in Charge of Construction, Vietnam, were designated to supervise the bulk of military construction, although the majority of the work was being performed by civilian contractors. Included in this construction were new Market Time and Game Warden bases.

Headquarters Support Activity, Saigon was destined to transfer its functions to the Army by May 1966, but some of its personnel and facilities were to be incorporated into Naval Support Activity Saigon to provide logistic support for U.S. Navy activities in the II, III and IV Corps Tactical Zones. Naval Support Activity Danang (NSA Danang), activated in 1965 for support of Marine and Navy operations in the I Corps Tactical Zone (I CTZ), was to be expanded to support all U.S. and allied forces in I CTZ.

Also under construction were harbor facilities to support the military buildup. U.S. Navy Harbor Defense and Harbor Clearance units were to be assigned to these areas. In addition, mine countermeasures forces were to be employed, both on the main ship channels to Saigon and in the harbor and coastal areas. The possibility of a U.S. River Assault Group (RAG) was under consideration to supplement the South Vietnamese navy's RAGs in operations in the Mekong Delta and the Rung Sat Special Zone.

With the continually increasing United States Navy commitments in Vietnam, early 1966 brought the requirement for better integration of all U.S. Navy activities assigned to MACV. Three months of planning culminated in the establishment of U.S. Naval Forces, Vietnam on 1 April. In early January the requirements for a Naval Component Commander were forwarded to COMUSMACV. At this time, the Commanding General III Marine Amphibious Force (III MAF), with headquarters in Da Nang, was performing the task of Naval Component Commander for MACV; and Commander U.S. Naval Forces Philippines was the navy area coordination authority. Commanding General III MAF's many functions encompassed the direction of the bulk of the war effort in the I Corps Tactical Zone in addition to discharging the Naval Component Commander functions in South Vietnam (with the exception) of those functions performed by Chief, Naval Advisory Group (CHNAVADVGRP). His many duties in the I CTZ resulted in the NCC being unable to adequately supervise many NCC functions in the II, III and IV Corps Tactical Zones. In addition, the presence of the Commanding General, III MAF was almost continually required in the I CTZ, a 340 miles (550 km) separation from COMUSMACV Headquarters in Saigon. This prohibited frequent personal contact between COMUSMACV and his Naval Component Commander.

With the increase in U.S. naval forces, there also existed the need for a more responsive organization to provide for the supervision of uni-service Navy matters. Again, geography prevented effective supervision by Commanding General, III MAF, and to an even greater extent prevented effective participation by Commander U.S. Naval Forces, Philippines. Chief, Naval Advisory Group was unavoidably involved in naval matters not necessarily related to NAVADVGRP functions. As CHNAVADVGRP, he was a member of COMUSMACV staff, as such not in command of a naval organization, but tasked to advise COMUSMACV on naval matters. In addition, he was CTF 115 and CTF 116. Yet, involved as he was, he had not fully appropriate channels to the Naval Component Commander, the Fleet Commander nor the Pacific Fleet type commanders.

With the continuing growth of the Navy establishment in Vietnam and the problems of a Naval Component Commander remote from the center of naval operations, the need existed for a change in the Naval Component Commander structure to provide an organization more responsive to the needs of COMUSMACV and the Navy. It was proposed that a major Navy command with a flag officer be established in Saigon under the command of the United States Pacific Fleet and under the operational control of COMUSMACV. This command would exercise operational control under COMUSMACV of the Coastal Surveillance Force, the River Patrol Force and other Navy units as specifically assigned. In addition, the command would serve as the Navy area coordinator for South Vietnam.

On 13 January COMUSMACV proposed to CINCPAC the formation of just such a major Navy command, and that it be titled U.S. Naval Forces, U.S. Military Assistance Command, Vietnam (NAVFORV). Under this proposal, COMNAVFORV would have the additional duty of CHNAVADVGRP because of the prestige and possible political gain to the RVNN and Marine Corps. In addition, COMUSMACV proposed: that III MAF be designated as a separate uni-service command within MACV; that a flag officer junior to COMNAVFORV be Commander NSA Danang; and that COMNAVFORV through NSA Danang would provide logistic support to all U.S. Forces in the I CTZ; that Navy captains be ordered to command of Task Force 115 and Task Force 116; and that NAVFORV be established at the earliest possible date.

In late January the proposal was forwarded to the Joint Chiefs of Staff for approval. Approval was granted on 14 February, and mere definite requirements were worked out. Estimates of personnel requirements were prepared and forwarded to CINCPACFLT on 13 February. On 14 March CINCPACFLT forwarded the proposed tasks for COMNAVFORV, and recommended that the transfer of Naval Component Commander functions and the activation of NAVFORV be effected on 1 April.

On 1 April, in ceremonies aboard USS Lowe in Saigon Harbor, Rear Admiral Norvell G. Ward established and assumed command of NAVFORV. He retained the posts of CTF 115, CTF 116 and CHMAVADVGKP. On 16 April Admiral Ward was relieved as CTF 115 by Captain Clifford L. Stewart. On 21 April CINCPACFLT defined the terms of reference for COMNAVFORV as an in-service commander.

== Subordinate commands ==
=== Naval Intelligence Liaison Offices ===
Coincident with the formation of NAVFORV, the intelligence section was expanded to meet the growing intelligence requirements of the new command. During the first week of April the first of ten graduates of the Army's special basic intelligence course for Vietnam, conducted at Fort Holabird, arrived in country. They were to be assigned to ARVN Sector Operational Intelligence Centers in the Coastal and Mekong Delta sectors. Previous personnel assigned as Navy Intelligence Liaison Officers at Sector Operational Intelligence Centers had only a cursory introductory course prior to arrival in country. This represented an expansion from ten to twenty of the number of SOICs with Naval Intelligence Liaison Officers.

In addition, assistant intelligence officers were assigned to each of the four Coastal Zones to assist the intelligence officer at Coastal Zone Headquarters. Three intelligence analyst billets were created for DaNang, Nha Trang and Can Tho.

Coincident with the formation of NAVFORV, the daily intelligence summary was sent to out-of-country commands and was forwarded to CINCPACFLT and the Chief of Naval Operations.

On 18 April 1972 Naval Forces Headquarters completed relocation from downtown Saigon to MACV Headquarters next to Tan Son Nhut Airport.

== References used ==
- COMUSMACV msg 130159z January 66 (S)
- CINCPAC msg 251120Z Jan 66 (S)
- JCS msg 142250Z Feb 66 (S)
- CINCPACFLT msg 142351Z Mar 66 (S)
- CINCPACFLT INSTRUCTION 5440.11
- Berman, Larry (2013). Zumwalt: The Life and Times of Admiral Elmo Russell "Bud" Zumwalt, Jr. Annapolis, Maryland: Naval Institute Press. ISBN 978-1-59114-169-3.
- Cutler, Thomas J. (2000). Brown Water, Black Berets: Coastal and Riverine Warfare in Vietnam. Naval Institute Press, Annapolis, Maryland. ISBN 978-1-55750-196-7.
- Mann, Robert (2001). A Grand Delusion: America's Descent into Vietnam. New York, New York: Basic Books/Perseus Book Group. ISBN 978-0-465-04369-9.
- Marolda, Edward J. (2002). The U.S. Navy in the Vietnam War: An Illustrated History. Dulles, Virginia: Brassey's. ISBN 978-1-57488-437-1.
- Marolda, Edward J. (1994). By sea, air, and land: An illustrated history of the US Navy and the war in Southeast Asia. Naval Historical Center, 1992 or 1994
- Summers Jr., Harry G. (1995). Historical Atlas of the Vietnam War. Houghton Mifflin Co., New York, New York. ISBN 978-0-395-72223-7.
