= Newport (Saigon) =

U.S.-South Vietnamese logistics hub north of Saigon

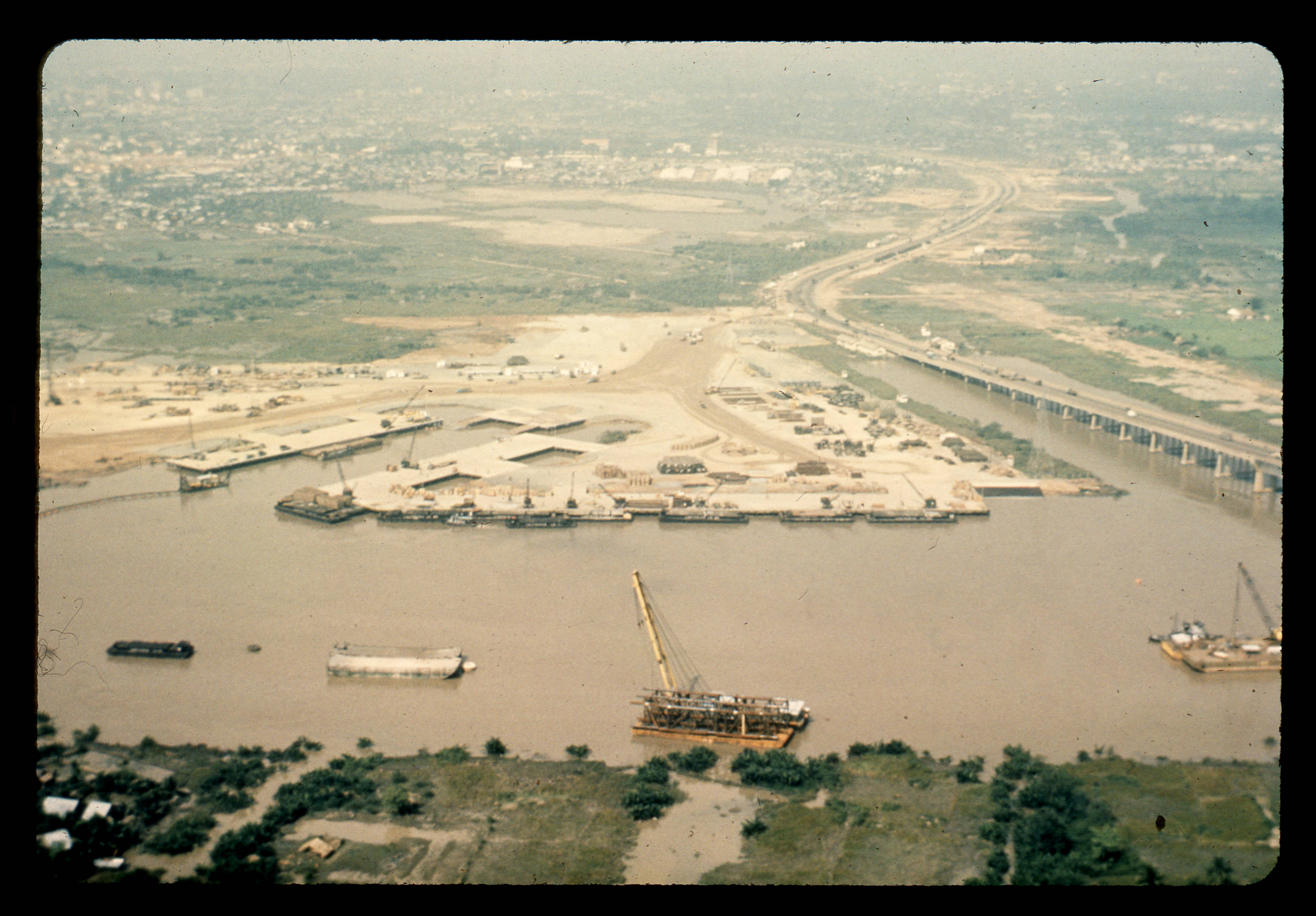
- Newport construction, November 1966

Site information
- Type: Army
- Controlled by: 1st Logistical Command

Location
- Coordinates: 10.796°N 106.725°E

Site history
- Built: 1965-7
- In use: 1966-75
- Battles/wars: Vietnam War

Newport (Vietnamese: Tân Cảng) was a United States Army and Army of the Republic of Vietnam (ARVN) logistics base located on the Saigon River 2 miles (3.2 km) north of central Saigon in southern Vietnam.

== History ==
With the increased movement of U.S. troops into the Saigon area to support the Vietnam War, the deep-draft facilities there proved completely inadequate. However, a plan was already underway to construct a new port on the Saigon River upstream from the city. This site, called Newport, was in a sparsely populated area adjacent to Highway 1 and the bridge connecting Saigon with the newly developing Long Binh Post some 20 miles (32 km) northeast of Saigon. This massive project financed by the Army was constructed by RMK-BRJ.

The project was approved in November 1965 and designated as Military Assistance Command, Vietnam's (MACV) highest priority construction project.

To get the port operational as soon as possible, planning proceeded for seven lighterage berths and four Landing Ship, Tank (LST) slips and ramps. Four deep-draft berths would be built later. By mid-May 1966, RMK-BRJ had dredged the LST slips and drove the first piles for the barge wharves. Unfortunately, the silty material from the river could not be used to fill the former rice paddy land. Instead, local contractors furnished much of the fill, and their sampans accounted for about 3,900 of the 9,150 cubic yards of sand hauled in from other places each day. By midyear, the director of construction reported that RMK-BRJ drove 156 piles for the barge and LST wharves. The firm's concrete precast yards also made eighteen concrete deck slabs for the deep-draft wharf. The informal estimate to complete the demanding project now reached $30 million. In August 1966, the Joint Chiefs of Staff asked for a reevaluation of the entire project to refine the cost required to complete the port as originally designed. The new figure totaled more than $61 million, approximately double the earlier estimate. To save some money, the Army deferred some warehouses and other buildings. In October 1966, the construction office turned over four barge wharves, one Landing Craft Mechanized and Landing Craft Utility ramp, one LST slip and 38 acres of filled land to the 1st Logistical Command.

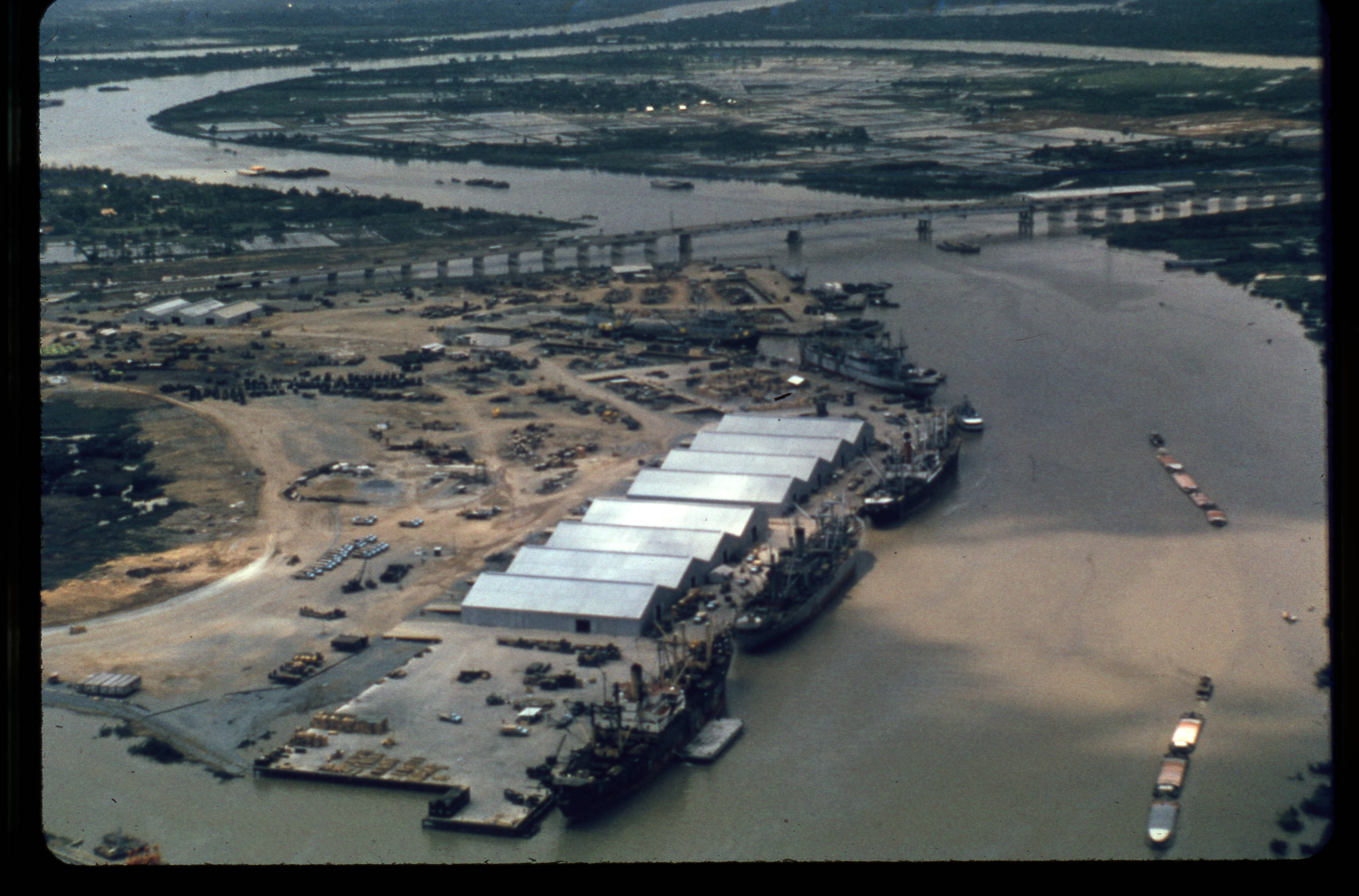
Newport in July 1967

RMK-BRJ then began work on the deep-water berths and port buildings. When completed, the complex, consisting of a 2,400 feet (730 m) wharf, four deep-draft berths, and two transit sheds, each containing four interconnected buildings, 120 feet (37 m) by 200 feet (61 m), totaled 290,000 square feet. In late January 1967, the first berth was declared open and commemorated in a ribbon-cutting ceremony as the first ship came alongside. The second berth was completed in March, and all four were finished in July. Construction of a power plant and a maintenance shop proceeded concurrently with the pier work. At the peak of the project, RMK-BRJ employed some 1,800 Vietnamese workers and 210 Americans and third-country nationals. The work schedule consisted of two 10-hour shifts per day, seven days a week. Newport could now accommodate simultaneously four oceangoing vessels, four shallow-draft landing craft and seven barges. The total construction cost was in excess of US$50m.

Newport was operated by the 71st Transport Battalion's 154th, 368th, 551st, 561st and 567th Service Companies.

Newport was connected by a spur line to the national railway in 1971.

== Current use ==
The base has been redeveloped as Vinhomes Central Park.
