= OICC =

OICC may refer to:

- Officer in Charge of Construction RVN, a United States military organization during the Vietnam War.
- Kermanshah Airport, Iran, by ICAO airport code
