= RMK-BRJ =

American construction consortium

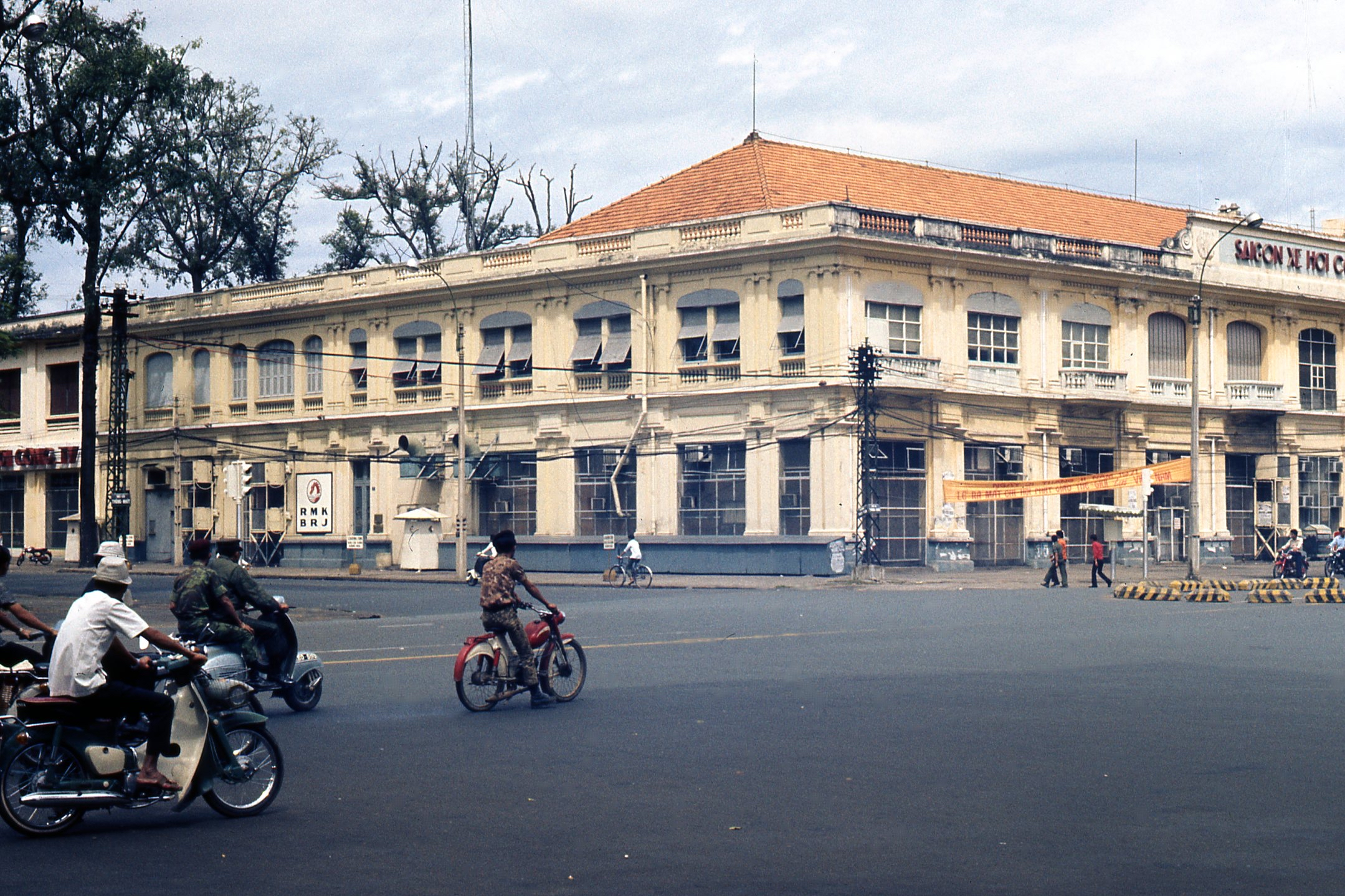
RMK-BRJ headquarters in Saigon in 1972

RMK-BRJ emblems

RMK-BRJ was an American construction consortium of four of the largest American companies, put together by the United States Navy during the Vietnam War. Its purpose was to build critically needed infrastructure in South Vietnam, so that the Americans could escalate the introduction of American combat troops and materiel into Vietnam. This construction contract, amounting to $1.9 billion (equivalent to $14 billion in 2017 dollars), completed a construction program deemed to be the largest in history up to that time. The consortium derived its name from its four constituent companies: Raymond International, Morrison Knudsen, Brown & Root, and J.A. Jones.

Over the ten-year life of the contract, RMK-BRJ trained 200,000 Vietnamese workers in construction and administrative trades. The use of a civilian contractor and construction force in an active theater of combat operations was authorized for the first time in U.S. history.

== Construction contract ==
=== Context ===
In the 1950s, the United States Department of Defense assigned responsibility for contract construction in support of military assistance and military construction in regions around the world to the three major branches of defense: the Army, Navy and Air Force. The navy was assigned as the Department of Defense contract construction agent in Southeast Asia, among other regions.

=== Contract parties ===
In late 1961, the United States Navy's Bureau of Yards and Docks, known after 1966 as the Naval Facilities Engineering Command (NAVFAC), entered into a contract with some of the largest American construction companies to build infrastructure in Vietnam in support of the Republic of Vietnam. Based upon their experience with dams, ports, highways, and roads, Raymond International was selected in partnership with Morrison Knudsen, known for heavy international construction. Raymond had extensive experience driving piles around the world, including Mexico and Tokyo, as well as The Pentagon in World War II. They had both been part of a consortium to build naval bases in the Pacific Ocean in World War II with a $1.5 billion contract. Morrison Knudsen was designated as the managing partner for the new contract. This consortium was then known as RMK.

By August 1965, it had become clear that the construction program was growing much larger than originally expected, so the navy broadened the construction consortium by adding Brown & Root and J.A. Jones Construction. The consortium then became known as RMK-BRJ. The consortium was also known informally as "The Vietnam Builders".

=== Contract type ===
The original letter contract (NBy-44105) with a fixed price was signed on 8 December 1961. But as the security condition in Vietnam deteriorated and new construction requirements arose, the contract was changed to a cost-plus contract with a fixed percentage management fee. RMK-BRJ could then be directed to begin projects before design was started or completed, at remote sites, with uncertainty of the local labor forces, and reduced freedom of action due to the security situation. In 1966 as the value of the contract approached $1 billion, the contract was renegotiated to lower the management fee commensurate with the increased scope and award the fee percentage based upon the contractor's performance, a cost-plus-award-fee contract. Under this contract, the navy provided all materials, equipment, shipping, and transportation.

=== Contract completion ===
Construction work under the contract was completed in June 1972, and the contractor facilities in Saigon were turned over to the South Vietnamese government on 3 July 1972. The final closeout report was presented in October 1972. The final contract value was $1.865 billion, which does not include the value of government-furnished materials, equipment, shipping and transportation.

=== Contracting Officer ===
The Contracting Officer for the navy was the Officer in Charge of Construction, Republic of Vietnam (OICC-RVN), with its main office in downtown Saigon. The OICC directed the contractor's work program as well as observing the construction and evaluating the contractor's performance. In February 1967, OICC staff was 1,050, including 90 Navy Civil Engineer Corps officers, at 47 sites and 782 separate projects.

== History ==
=== Initial projects ===
In 1960, the government of South Vietnam requested the U.S. Military Assistance Advisory Group (MAAG) to develop plans for new military airfields at Bien Hoa north of Saigon, and at the central highlands town of Pleiku, as well as improvements to the French-built airfields at Tan Son Nhut Airport in Saigon and Da Nang Air Base in Da Nang. One of the first projects for RMK-BRJ was construction of a new airfield at Pleiku. The MAAG made this their priority in January 1962, and wanted the airfield completed by July 1962. Design for the facility had not started yet. But RMK-BRJ completed it on time and Pleiku Air Base was opened in July. Air control radar stations at Tan Son Nhut Air Base in Saigon and Monkey Mountain Facility in Da Nang were constructed at the same time.

=== Vietnam War build-up ===
After the Tonkin Gulf incident in August 1964, the deteriorating political situation of the southern government after the assassination of President Ngô Đình Diệm, and an increase in Viet Cong large unit actions, the U.S. government decided to introduce American ground combat troops into Vietnam. On 8 March 1965, 3,500 U.S. Marines of the 3rd Marine Division landed on the beach near Da Nang to protect the airfield at Da Nang, then operated by the U.S. Air Force. In the first five months of 1965, U.S. troop levels increased to 55,000. By the end of 1965, 200,000 troops had been introduced into Vietnam. Additional escalation of U.S. troop levels to 543,000 continued through 1969. But a build-up of logistics facilities of all kinds was required prior to introduction of more troops into Vietnam.

=== Urgent logistics requirements ===
Existing military logistics facilities within Vietnam were vastly inadequate to support increased troop levels and the materiel required to support them. Only three airfields were capable of jet aircraft operations. Port capacity was limited to the Saigon Port on the Saigon River, and ships were waiting months to offload. Shipping of war material as well as economic aid and construction materials and equipment for RMK-BRJ quickly outstripped the port capacity. 99% of all ammunition, and all of the petroleum products required for war operations arrived by sea. RMK-BRJ itself required 100,000 tons of shipping per month. Additional ports were required to be built as soon as possible.

=== Logistics "islands" ===
The logistics plan developed by General William Westmoreland in early 1965 realized that several more deep-draft seaports must be constructed as quickly as possible, along with accompanying jet-capable airfields with 10,000 feet (3,000 m) concrete runways. The war had no fixed front, and it was clear operations would be required throughout the country. So the logistics planners developed the concept of "logistic islands" or bases around Vietnam from which to seek out the enemy. New ports, air bases, ammunition dumps, petroleum storage, and supply bases would provide a grid in the country from which troops and matériel could be distributed to operating bases inland. In November 1965, Secretary of Defense Robert McNamara met with General Westmoreland in Saigon and promised to provide $1 billion in funding for this construction, as well as $200 million to order construction materials and equipment immediately.

=== Primary construction requirements ===
Additional deep-draft seaports with 29 berths were to be constructed at Cam Ranh Bay, Qui Nhon, Da Nang, Vung Ro Bay and Vung Tau, as well as the largest new port in Saigon. Accompanying air bases were to be constructed at Bien Hoa, Cam Ranh, Chu Lai, Phan Rang, Tuy Hoa and Phu Cat. Storage for matériel was to be constructed at all of these locations, in addition to troop cantonments. All of these requirements were to be fulfilled within two years.

=== Construction progress ===
All of the logistical projects were completed in time for the major build-up of U.S. troop levels in 1967 and 1968. At the same time, six naval bases with slips for small craft were constructed, as well as 26 hospitals with 8,280 beds, 20 base camps, 10.4 million square feet of warehousing, 3.1 million barrels of petroleum storage, 5,460 square feet of ammunition storage, 75 airfields capable of supporting C-130 supply aircraft, 4,100 kilometers of highways, 182 water wells and housing for 450,000 Vietnamese service men and their families.

Over the ten-year life of the contract, RMK-BRJ moved 91 million cubic yards (71 million cubic meters) of earth, equivalent to a hole 0.25 miles (0.40 km) square and 0.25 miles (0.40 km) deep. 48 million tons of rock products were placed, enough to ballast a railroad halfway around the world. 10.8 million tons of asphalt were placed, enough to pave a 5,500 miles (8,900 km) roadway from Vietnam to Europe. 3,700,000 cubic yards (2.8 million cubic meters) of concrete were placed, enough to build a wall 2 feet (0.61 m) wide and 5 feet (1.5 m) tall completely around southern Vietnam. 11.5 million concrete blocks were produced and laid, sufficient to build 16,700 two-bedroom homes. 33 million square-feet (3 million m^{2}) of buildings were erected, equivalent to a skyscraper 6.2 miles (10.0 km) high, or 550 six-story buildings like the U.S. Embassy built in Saigon.

The peak of RMK-BRJ employment to meet all these requirements was 51,044 in July 1966. Of these, about 9.5% were Americans, 13.5% Third country nationals, and 77% Vietnamese. The work-in-place per month reached $64 million in March 1967, at 40 construction sites. The actual work-in-place was thus 50% beyond the planned $40 million work-in-place.

Over 60% of all of the construction work done in South Vietnam over the period of the Vietnam War was accomplished by RMK-BRJ, with the remainder done primarily by military engineering construction forces.

=== Contractor logistics ===
In March 1967, RMK-BRJ held 5,560 pieces of construction equipment with a value of $115 million, plus 1,000 pieces of rented equipment, and the value of construction materials available was $185 million. In early 1966, 196 million board feet of lumber was ordered, which had the effect of absorbing all U.S. west coast lumber sources in that year. 10,000 doors were ordered, as well as 750,000 tons of cement.

In 1966 alone, RMK leased or chartered 16 aircraft, two LSTs, ten LCMs, 30 barges and ten tugboats.

=== Safety record ===
52 RMK-BRJ employees were killed and 248 wounded as a result of hostile enemy action. However, RMK-BRJ did 550 million man-hours of work under contract, yet their safety rate was four times less than that of contractors in the United States at that time. RMK-BRJ maintained a medical staff of 130 people in site dispensaries throughout the country, performing over 2 million examinations and treatments.

== Controversies ==
In 1966, The U.S. Senate Permanent Subcommittee on Investigations began an investigation into alleged corruption or graft in connection with loss of shipments into Vietnam, including foreign aid materials, Post exchange products, and military construction materials. The subsequent investigation did uncover losses from the Post exchanges in particular. There was loss of RMK-BRJ construction materials due to open storage at major construction sites and at seaports. RMK-BRJ had been directed by the military not to build contractor facilities for materials storage until after the critical ports and airbases had been constructed. Beginning in 1967, RMK-BRJ was then allowed to construct storage facilities, leading to 97 warehouses at 20 sites around the country.

By 1966, it had become apparent that there was a $200 million shortfall in funding for military construction by RMK-BRJ. It was initially thought that this was due to RMK-BRJ mismanagement, but after the subsequent investigation, the Department of Defense reported to the Senate Appropriations Subcommittee that the cost overruns were caused by their own internal processes. The Associated Press reported that "The Pentagon admits it misled civilian contractors in the billion dollar Vietnam construction program by overstating probable contract awards and under-estimating costs. In the wake of reports alleging company waste and mismanagement, Defense officials praised the private combine known as RMK-BRJ for doing 'an amazingly competent' job under tough circumstances."

== List of major projects ==
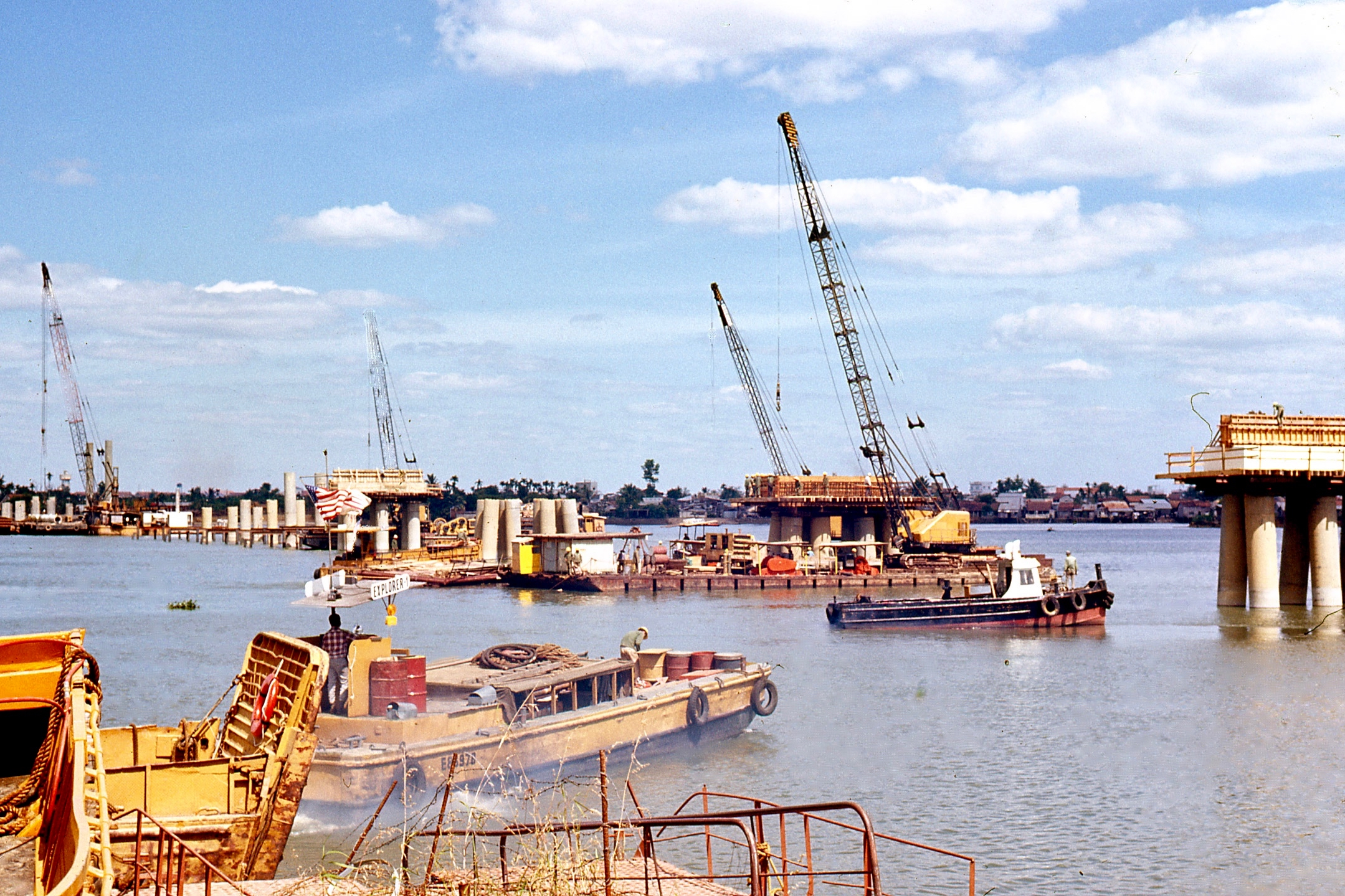
Major Bridge in Saigon Area

All projects and dates compiled from Tregaskis.

=== 1962 ===
- Bien Hoa Air Base
- Pleiku Air Base
- Tan Son Nhut Air Base Taxiways, Saigon
- Air Control Radar Station at Tan Son Nhut Airport, Saigon
- Air Control Radar Station at Monkey Mountain Facility, Da Nang

=== 1963 ===
- Cam Ranh Bay port, one deep-draft pier
- Da Nang Air Base runway extension
- Soc Trang Airfield expansion
- Tan Son Nhut passenger and freight terminals, Saigon
- Nha Trang Air Base expansion
- Vietnam Air Force Academy, Nha Trang
- Can Tho ammunition depot and wharf

=== 1964 ===
- Binh Thuy Air Base
- Radio Research Unit, Phu Bai
- 8th Field Hospital, Nha Trang
- Qui Nhon Hospital

=== 1965 ===
- Repair of Brink BOQ after bombing, Saigon
- Cam Ranh Air Base
- U.S. Army Logistics Depot, Tan Thuan, Saigon
- Chu Lai Air Base new runway
- Da Nang Air Base additional runway
- Marble Mountain Air Facility helicopter field, Da Nang
- Naval Support Activity Danang
- Bien Hoa Air Base buildings
- Vinh Long Airfield cantonment facilities
- Navy pier at An Thoi Naval Base, Phu Quoc

=== 1966 ===
- U.S. Embassy, Saigon
- Long Binh Army Post and Depot, HQ U.S. Army
- Da Nang Port
- East Da Nang bridge and highways
- Army Ammunition and Logistic Support facility, Cam Ranh
- Phu Cat Air Base, Binh Dinh
- Vung Tau port and naval base
- Phan Rang Air Base, additional runway
- Saigon Port warehouses
- Thu Duc Island Depot for RMK-BRJ
- Armed Forces Radio Television Building, Saigon
- Additional runway at Ton Son Nhut Airport, Saigon
- Additional buildings at Bien Hoa Air Base
- 400-bed hospital, Pleiku
- Logistics center, Nha Trang
- Vinh Long Airfield helicopter base
- Navy riverine base, Can Tho

=== 1967 ===
- Newport, Saigon
- "Pentagon East" MACV HQ, Saigon
- Additional runway at Bien Hoa Air Base
- Cam Ranh Bay port, additional 3 piers and ammo pier
- Cam Ranh naval base
- Quy Nhon airfield
- Quy Nhon Port dredging and pier
- Dong Tam small-draft port
- Tan My Base LST port

=== 1968–1970 ===
- Aircraft shelters
- Highways and bridges country-wide
- Base facilities

=== 1971–1972 ===
- Saigon Bypass highway and 5 major bridges
- Ammunition Depot, Long Binh
- Ammunition Depot, Da Nang
- Highways and bridges country-wide
- "Tiger cages" of Côn Sơn Prison

== Legacy ==
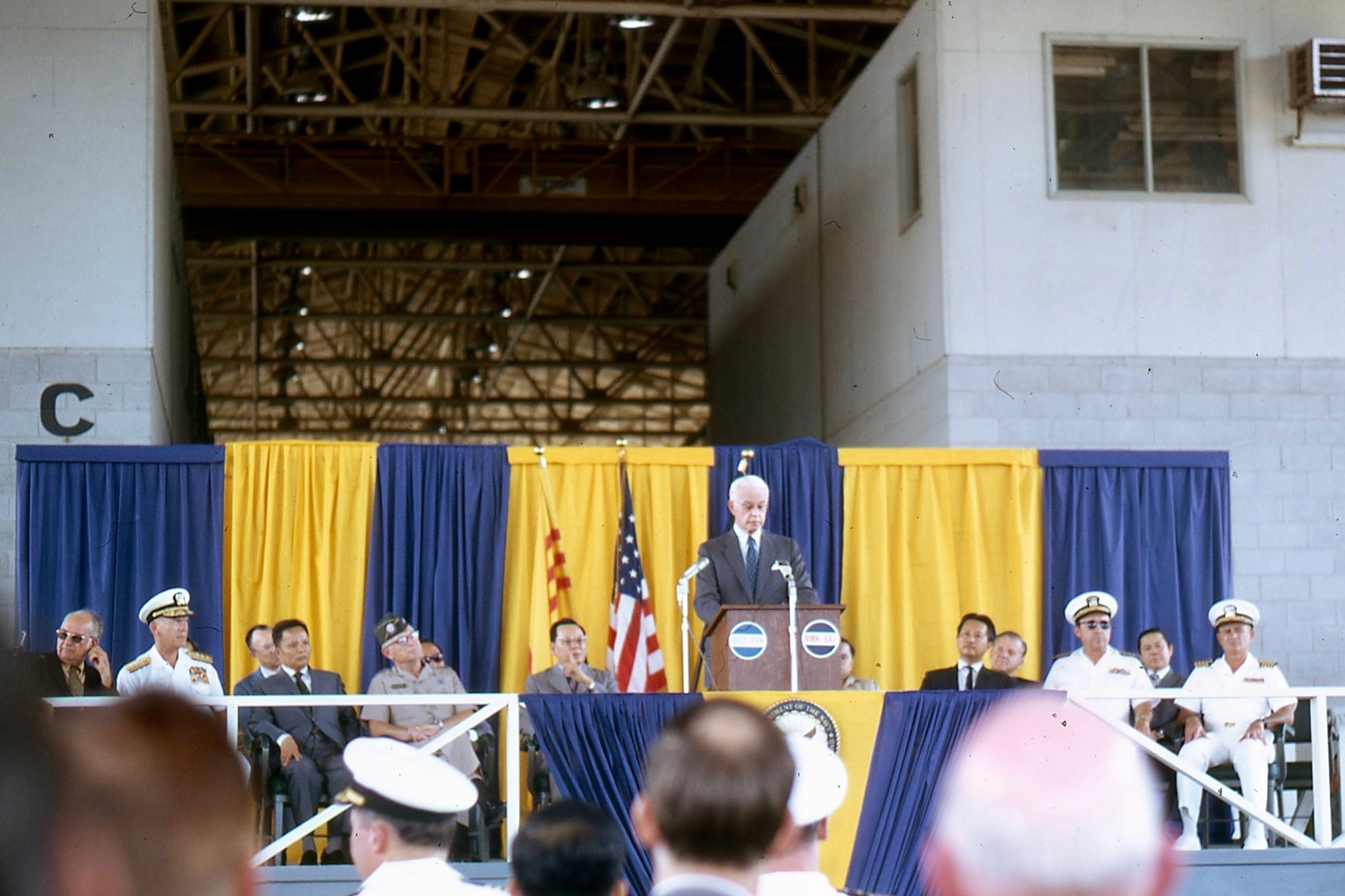
Ambassador Ellsworth Bunker at RMK-BRJ Ceremony 3 July 1972

The six seaports, eight jet airports, and highways and bridges continue to serve the people and support the economy of Vietnam today. 200,000 Vietnamese workers were trained in construction and administrative trades by RMK-BRJ, and they continue to work or train their successors today in building up the Vietnamese construction industry. At the time, it was recognized that the training of these workers was contributing to increased prosperity of Vietnamese people.

At the July 3, 1972 close-out ceremony for the RMK-BRJ contract, U.S. Ambassador Ellsworth Bunker stated: "I am pleased and proud to join in commemorating the completion of the RMK-BRJ construction program in Vietnam. This occasion, which marks the successful conclusion of a decade of achievement, is an especially gratifying and hopeful moment, for it reminds us that construction in the cause of war has also brought construction in the cause of peace and progress… At a time when all too many forces are bent on destruction, RMK-BRJ's ten years of accomplishment have been in my opinion one of the finest episodes in our nation's history".
