= Marble Mountain Air Facility =

- Marble Mountains (Vietnam)
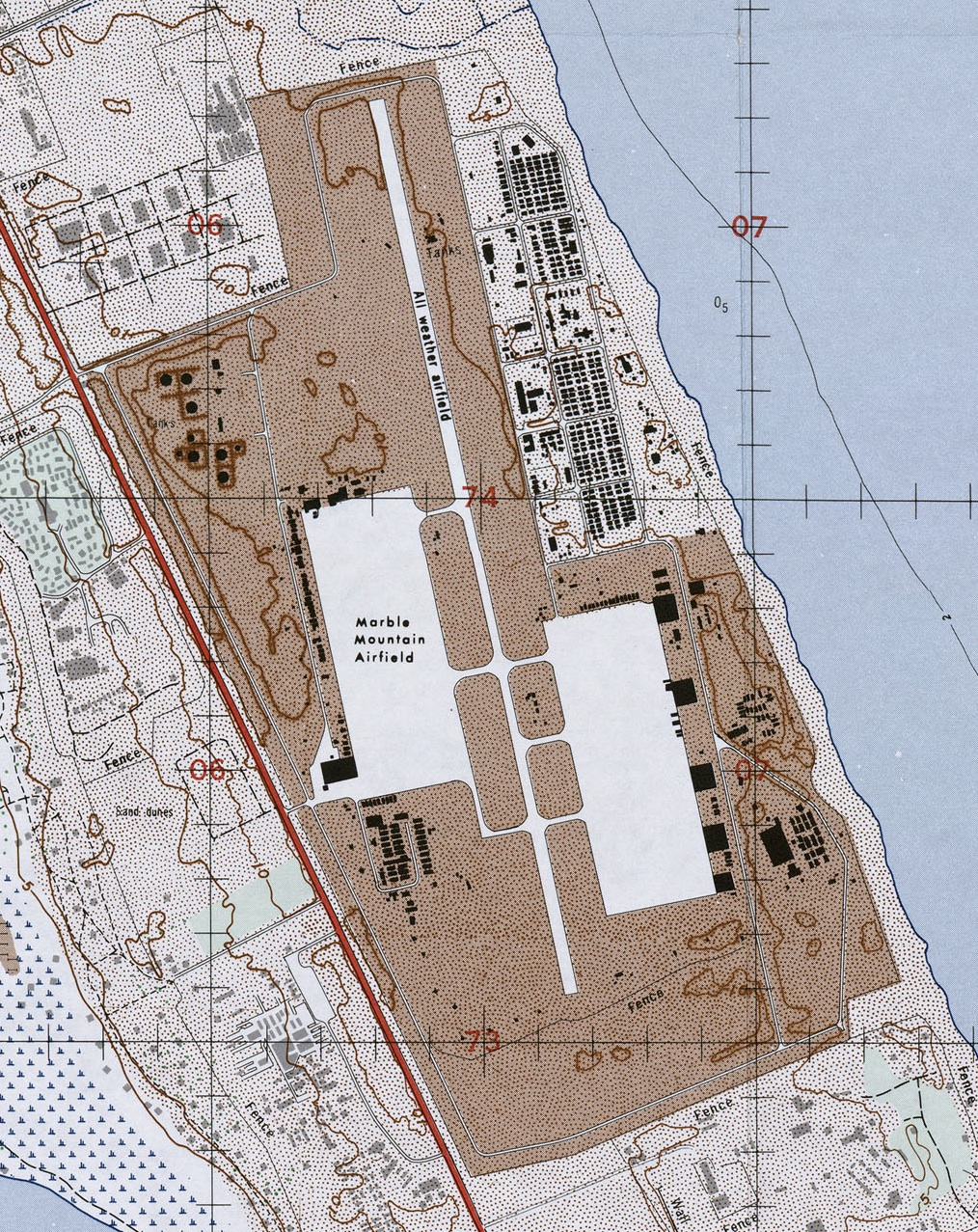
- MMAF layout in 1969

Site information
- Type: Military air field
- Controlled by: USMC (1965–71); United States Army (1971–72); Republic of Vietnam Air Force (1972–75)

Site history
- In use: August 1965 – March 1975
- Battles/wars: Vietnam War

Marble Mountain Air Facility
- IATA: none; ICAO: none

Summary
- Airport type: Military
- Location: Marble Mountain, Vietnam
- Elevation AMSL: 29 ft (8.8 m)
- Coordinates: 16°01′33.4″N 108°15′12.5″E
- Interactive map of Marble Mountain Air Facility

Runways
Direction	Length		Surface
Direction	ft	m	Surface
	5,000	1,524	Asphalt
	1,000	305	Asphalt

Marble Mountain Air Facility (MMAF), also known as Da Nang East Airfield, Marble Mountain Army Airfield and Nuoc Man Airfield, was an aviation facility used primarily by the United States Marine Corps during the Vietnam War. It was a helicopter facility that was constructed in August 1965 and served as home to Marine Aircraft Group 16 (MAG-16), the 5th Special Forces Group and an assortment of other squadrons until May 1971. It was controlled by the United States Army from May 1971 to August 1972 and finally by the Republic of Vietnam Air Force (RVNAF) from 29 August 1972 to 29 March 1975 when it fell to the People's Army of Vietnam (PAVN). It was in Quảng Nam Province 5 miles (8 km) southeast of Da Nang Air Base on a strip of beach between China Beach and the Marble Mountains.

== History ==
On 28 July 1965, President Lyndon B. Johnson announced that the U.S. would increase the number of its forces in South Vietnam from 75,000 to 125,000. The arrival of additional USMC and United States Air Force squadrons at Da Nang AB led to severe overcrowding at the base and the 1st Marine Aircraft Wing (I MAW) began looking for an alternative site for the helicopter squadrons of MAG-16. The Marines ultimately chose a stretch of sandy beach on the South China Sea that was about five miles southeast of Da Nang and just north of a series of red marble mountains for their first helicopter facility. American military construction units were overtasked at the time so the construction of the field was done by RMK-BRJ under the direction of the U.S. Navy Officer in Charge of Construction RVN. By the end of August 1965, they had completed a 2,000-foot (610 m) runway and on 26 August, MAG 16 officially moved in. A week later Military Assistance Command, Vietnam (MACV) would approve the name "Marble Mountain Air Facility" (MMAF).

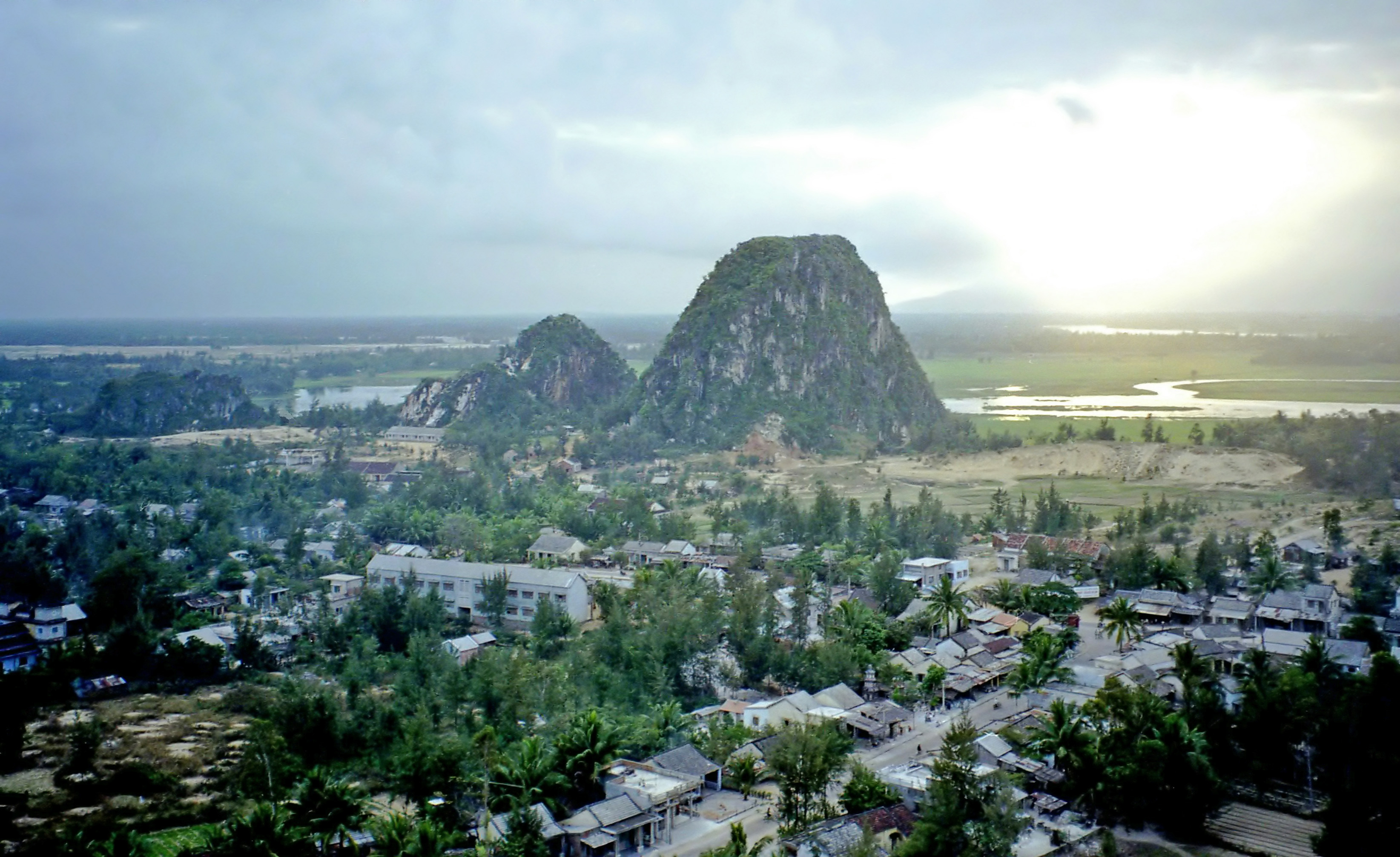
Marble Mountains near Da Nang

On the evening of 27–28 October 1965, approximately 90 Viet Cong (VC) attacked MMAF. They attacked under the cover of 60 mm mortar fire using four demolition teams armed with Bangalore torpedoes and hand grenades. They were able to reach the MAG 16 ramp destroying 19 aircraft (13 UH-1E and 6 UH-34 helicopters) and damaging another 35 (4 UH-1E and 26 UH-34). VMO-2 took the brunt of the attack with 13 of its UH-1Es destroyed leaving the squadron with only four serviceable aircraft. The attack left two Marines and one Navy Corpsman killed in action with another 91 wounded. Seventeen VC were killed during the battle along with four wounded who were taken prisoner.

MMAF saw the arrival of the first CH-46 Sea Knight helicopters in South Vietnam when HMM-164 arrived on 8 March 1966 with 27 aircraft from the USS Valley Forge.

On 31 January 1968, on the first day of the Tet Offensive, MMAF received 29 incoming PAVN/VC 122 mm rockets resulting in one minor injury and minor damage to one CH-53A Sea Stallion and substantial damage to another four CH-53As. Ten CH-46As and eight UH-34Ds also received limited damage. Four VMO-2 UH-1E helicopter gunships were launched in defense of MMAF and engaged VC units.

Beginning in 1969 the United States began to reduce its forces in Vietnam and by mid-October all remaining Marine helicopter squadrons were consolidated at MMAF. On 1 June 1971 Marble Mountain Air Facility was turned over to the United States Army.

In February 1971 the 11th Aviation Group was assigned to the 1st Aviation Brigade and redeployed to Marble Mountain.

On 12 April 1972 a mortar attack on the base caused major damage to an OV-1D. On 15 April a mortar attack on the base caused major damage to five UH-1Hs and one OH-58. On 13 May a mortar attack on the base caused major damage to an OH-6. On 11 June a mortar attack on the base caused major damage to two OV-1Ds.

In August 1972 the 11th Aviation Group departed Marble Mountain Army Airfield and resettled at Da Nang AB. On 5 September 1972 the base was handed over to the South Vietnamese.

== Squadrons based at Marble Mountain ==
The following is an incomplete list of squadrons that were stationed at MMAF during the Vietnam War and the times that they were there:

Marine Aircraft Group 16 (United States Marine Corps Aviation)

- HMM-164 – March 1966 – March 1967
- HMM-165 –
- HMM-361
- HMM-263 – 11 October 1965 – served for 2+ years
- HMM-265 – 22 May 1966 – July 1967
- HMM-364 – 10 December 1968 – 16 February 1971
- HMH-463 – December 1966 – May 1971
- HML-167 – 1 April 1968 – June 1971
- HML-367 – December 1969 – June 1971
- VMO-2 – July 1968
- 16th Combat Aviation Brigade – December 1966 – 1969
- 282nd Assault Helicopter Company – 1966–1970 – served at Marble Mountain until approx Dec 1971. Shortly later the company was disbanded.
- 245th Surveillance Aircraft Company – 1967–1970

11th Aviation Group

- D Troop, 1st Squadron, 1st Cavalry Regiment (1/1 Air Cav)
- D Troop, 17th Cavalry Regiment
- 37th Signal Battalion

== Capture of MMAF ==
By 26 March 1975 Huế and all of Quảng Trị, Thừa Thiên, Quảng Nam and Quảng Ngãi Provinces had been captured by the PAVN and Da Nang was isolated. ARVN Lieutenant General Ngô Quang Trưởng organised his remaining forces, which numbered approximately 75,000 troops, into inner and outer defensive lines around the city, meanwhile the PAVN prepared to attack the city from four directions before its defenses could be properly established. Trưởng's defensive plans were hampered by the presence of 1–1,500,000 refugees and ARVN stragglers who had crowded the city. Throughout 26 March evacuation flights by Air America, Air Vietnam, the RVNAF and World Airways from Da Nang AB took place but could not keep up with the vast tide of refugees. On 27 March the situation at Da Nang AB was becoming increasingly chaotic as panicked refugees surged to board a World Airways flight and began mobbing the other flights and gathering on the taxiways and runways. By the evening of 27 March all evacuation flights out of the base were stopped, but propeller aircraft continued to evacuate refugees from Marble Mountain Air Facility.

The PAVN attack began on the morning of 28 March with an artillery barrage on the city, probing attacks quickly penetrated the ARVN defenses, and the fragile ARVN discipline collapsed and soldiers began to desert their positions and seek refuge for themselves and their families. On the night of 28 March Trưởng received intelligence that an all-out PAVN assault against the city would commence the next morning and he decided to abandon Da Nang and ordered his forces to move to beaches for evacuation by sea. The PAVN entered the outskirts of Da Nang by mid-morning on 29 March and by the afternoon were in control of the city.

== Current use ==
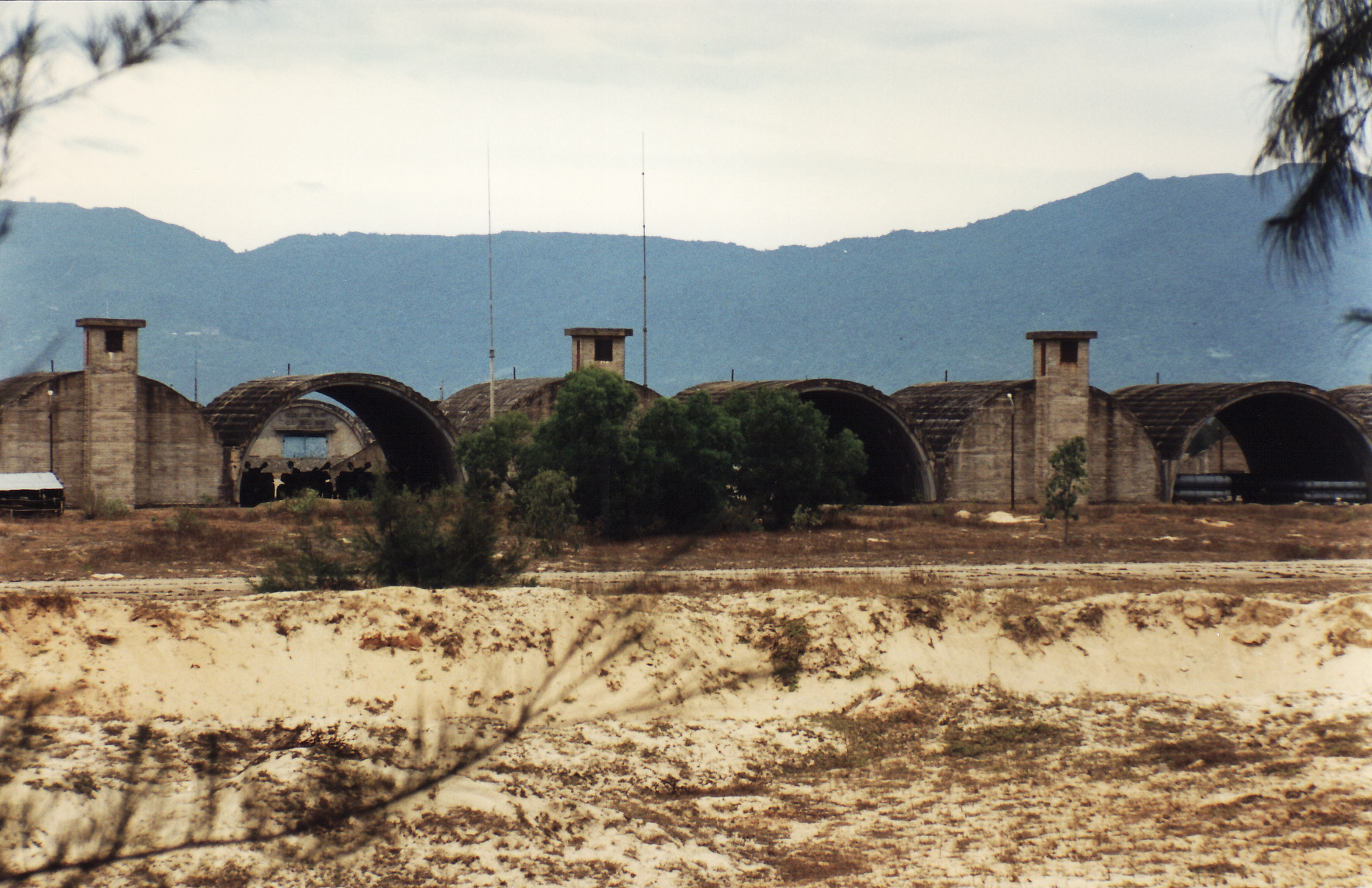
Marble Mountain Air Facility in April 1998

The base remained largely intact until the early 2000s when commercial developments began to encroach upon it. A highway connecting Da Nang and Hội An now runs through the former base and only a few concrete and steel "Wonderarch" aircraft shelters remain. Currently used by the Central Vietnam Helicopter Company (VNHC).

== Accidents and incidents ==
- On 30 April 1969, a Seaboard World Airlines DC-8 airliner with 219 passengers and 13 crewmembers accidentally landed at Marble Mountain when it had been cleared to land at the nearby Da Nang AB. After fuel and passengers were offloaded the aircraft was towed onto the north overrun and departed without incident.
- On 25 March 1970 two Marine AH-1s collided in mid-air 700 feet (210 m) above the base and crashed destroying both helicopters and killing all four crewmen.
