= Operation Stable Door =

Part of the Vietnam War (1966–1970)

- Part of the Vietnam War
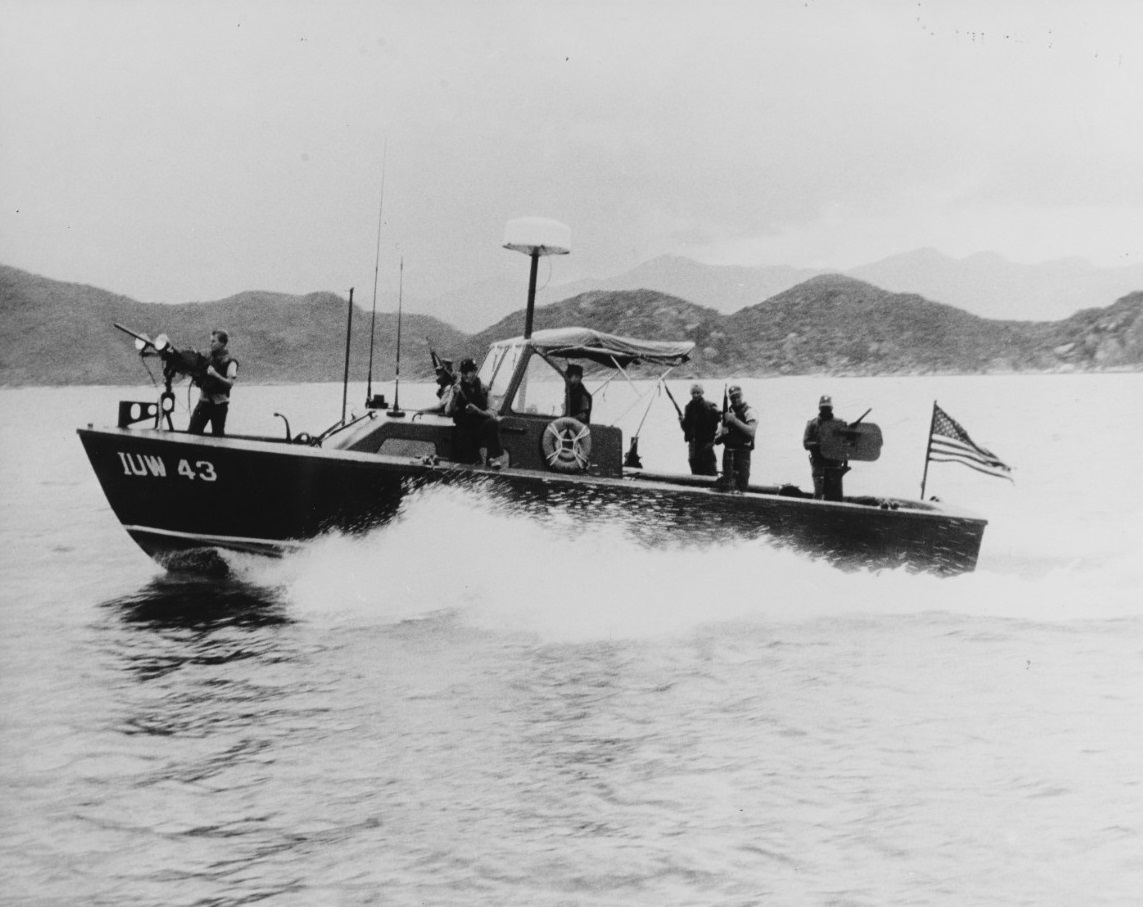
- Stable Door LCPL Mark XI, August 1966
Date	April 1966 – November 1970
Location	Cam Ranh Bay, Nha Trang, Qui Nhon, Vũng Rô Bay and Vung Tau
Result	Inconclusive

Belligerents
United States; Australia	North Vietnam; Viet Cong

Casualties and losses
(United States) 13 killed	

Operation Stable Door was the United States Navy and Royal Australian Navy's harbor defense operation during the Vietnam War. This operation complemented Operation Market Time designed to prevent infiltration along the South Vietnamese coast.

== Background ==
With the buildup of United States and other Free World Military Assistance Forces in South Vietnam, the Vietcong developed teams of sappers and swimmers to conduct clandestine attacks against riverine traffic, harbor anchorages and coastal cities and towns. To counter these units the United States Navy established a network of Harbour Entrance Control Posts along the coastline of South Vietnam and manned them with patrol forces and supporting Explosive Ordnance Disposal (EOD) Teams. The units also undertook local search and rescue operations.

== History ==
In January 1966 a harbor defense team composed of representatives from Commander, U.S. Pacific Fleet, Naval Advisory Group, Commander Minecraft, Pacific Fleet and Commander Inshore Undersea Warfare Group One visited the major coastal ports in South Vietnam to determine the harbor defense requirements. The ports visited included Danang, Qui Nhon, Nha Trang, Cam Ranh Bay and Vung Tau/Cat Lo. Based on the findings of the harbor defense team, a harbor defense plan was prepared for Vung Tau as a priority and for each of the other ports.

The plans provided for a harbor defense unit at each location with the mission of detecting and defending assigned land areas, water areas and water approaches against small surface craft attack, intrusion by deception craft, sabotage by sneak attack, underwater swimmers or subversive personnel and enemy mine-laying operations. A Harbor Entrance Control Post would serve as the command center for each unit. Radar search, visual search and searchlight sections would provide surveillance; while surface craft would provide harbor entrance patrols and investigation and prosecution of suspect contacts. The establishment of the harbour defense units would be in three phases. In phase 1 Mobile Inshore Undersea Warfare Surveillance (MIUWS) units consisting of five officers and 54 enlisted men would be deployed to each of the sites. The MIUWS would establish an interim harbour defense capability, establish the Harbor Control Post and provide basic surveillance. Phase 2 would be the semi-permanent phase with MIUWS personnel and equipment being phased out and replaced by newly arriving personnel. In Phase 3 a permanent harbour defense capacity would be in place until the end of hostilities.

The MIUWS units assigned were MIUWS 12 at Vung Tau, MIUWS 11 at Cam Ranh Bay, MIUWS 23 at Qui Nhon and MIUWS 22 at Nha Trang all under the operational control of Task Force 115, while the unit at Danang was under the control of Naval Support Activity Danang.

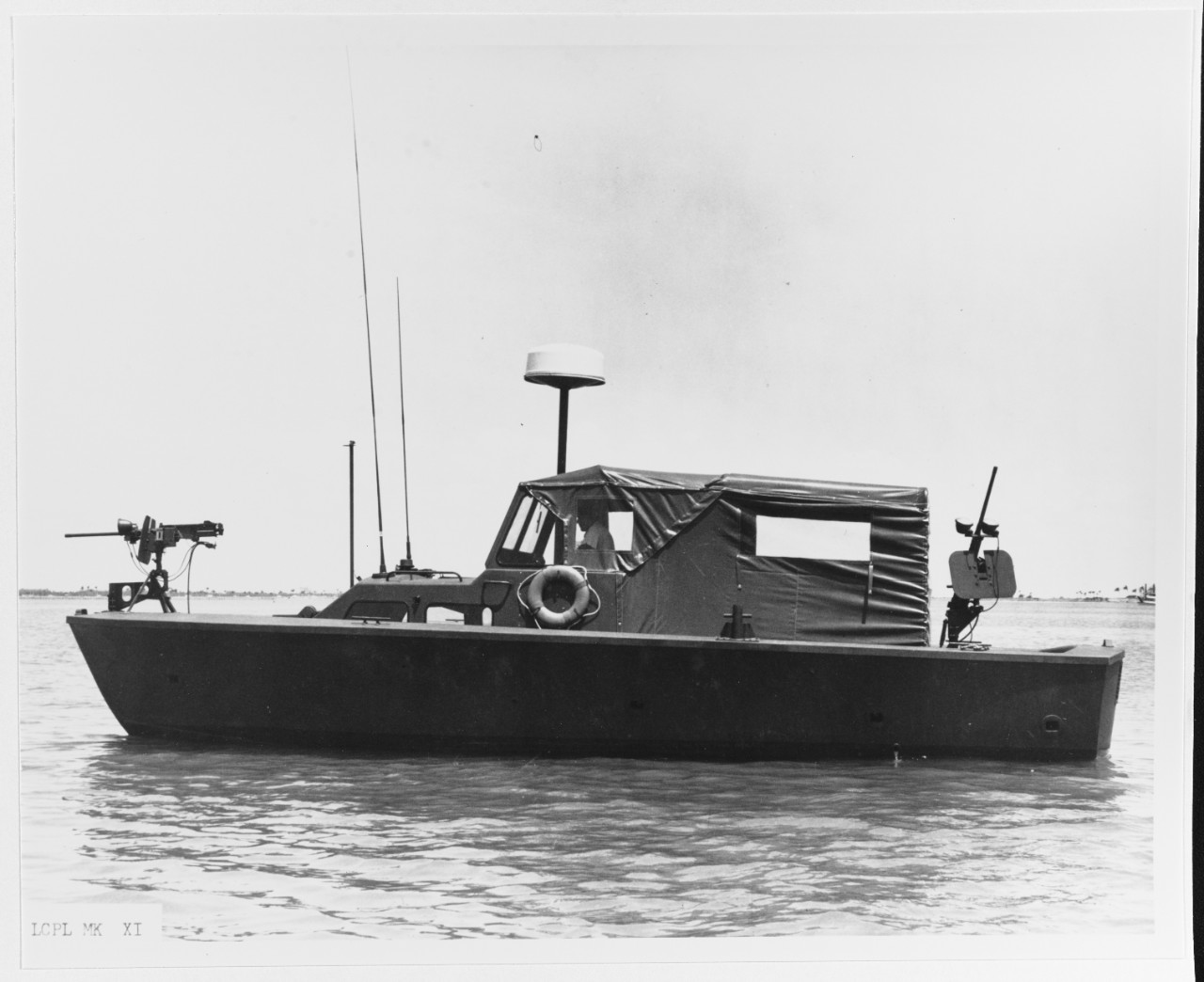
LCPL Mark XI patrol boat

MIUWS 12 arrived at Vung Tau in mid-April and established a Harbor Entrance Control Post in an old French fort overlooking the Vung Tau anchorage and channel. During May MIUWS 12 began operations at Vung Tau with one radar installed and one Landing Craft Personnel (Large) Mark XI (LCPL) patrol boat for harbour patrol. Also in May MIUWS 22 and 23 received their initial shipments of equipment.

In June 1966 MIUWS 11 became operational at Cam Ranh Bay with four LCPLs. MIUWS 12 at Vung Tau received two additional LCPLs to bring their total to four. Personnel from MIUWS 23 arrived in Qui Nhon during the month and started preparation of harbor defense facilities. Also, equipment for MIUWS 22 arrived at Nha Trang.

On 7 July 1966 MIUWS 23 at Qui Nhon became fully operational with the delivery of three LCPLs. On 15 July MIUWS 22 arrived at Nha Trang, achieving full operational capability with the arrival of boats and crews by the end of August.

In August 1966 harbor defense was given the operational name Stable Door. During August forces rose, with the arrival of 34 boat crew personnel, to 23 officers and 231 enlisted men. The construction of semi-permanent facilities, including barracks and mess halls, continued during the month. Eight of the eleven boats assigned to Stable Door were operational. Eight junks and 80 persons were detained by patrol units.

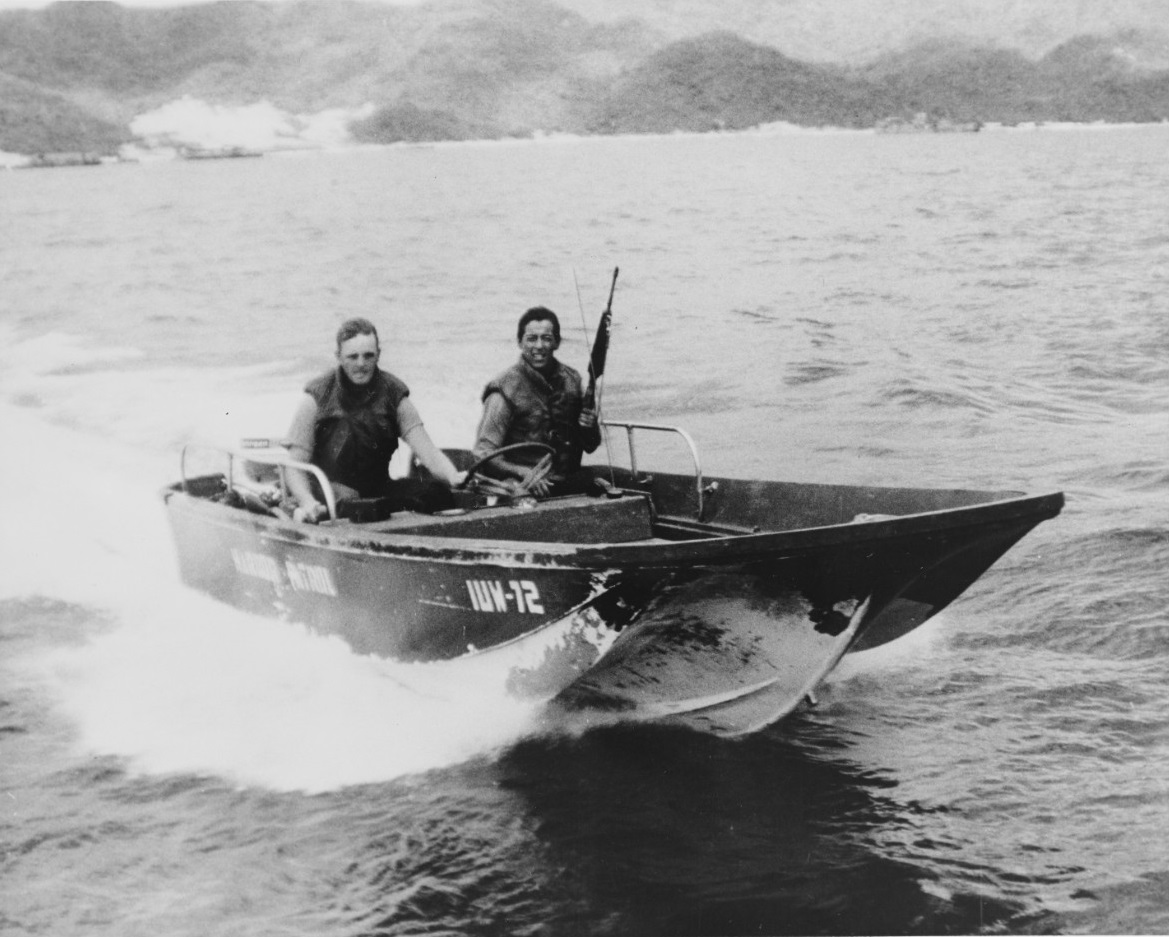
Boston Whaler skimmer, August 1966

With the arrival of 16 Boston Whaler skimmer crew personnel on 1 December Stable Door forces in South Vietnam reached a total of 496 men. The Inshore Undersea Warfare Group 1, (IUWG-1), WESTPAC Detachment, was moved from Saigon to Cam Ranh Bay on 5 December. MIUWS 11 was relieved at Cam Ranh Bay by Inshore Undersea Warfare Unit 2 on 9 December. Cam Ranh Bay received two additional LCPLs to increase the patrol boat strength to six. Construction was started on two quonset huts for a galley and mess hall and a potable 'water system was installed at the Cam Ranh Bay harbour defense base. At Vung Tau construction was started on four barracks and plans were drawn for the erection of a quonset hut for administrative and recreation spaces.

On 13 February 1967 Inshore Undersea Warfare Unit 1 (IUWU 1) relieved MIUWS 13 at Vung Tau. On the night of 22 February as a skimmer was approaching a suspect junk in Qui Nhon harbour a grenade was thrown into the skimmer, blowing one man into the water and mortally wounding another crewman. The boat captain opened fire on the junk's occupants, but they successfully evaded to the beach and their shore fire hampered the efforts to locate the missing crewman; his body was found two days later. By early 1968, MIUWS 23 at Qui Nhon was replaced by IUWU-3 and at Nha Trang MIUWS 22 was replaced by IUWU-4.

During June 1967 Stable Door patrols detected 38,000 junks and sampans, over 7,000 of these were inspected. Of the 4,175 craft boarded, 31 were detained along with 140 persons.

At 02:50 on 31 January 1968 a Cam Ranh Bay a Stable Door patrol succeeded in surfacing an enemy swimmer through the use of routine offensive grenade drops in the vicinity of the Norwegian tanker SS Pelican. This was the first time in Stable Door history that a swimmer had been captured. Approximately 30 minutes later, while the captured swimmer was being questioned, an explosion occurred on the bow of the SS Pelican, causing moderate damage. Initial interrogation of the swimmer indicated that additional swimmers were in the Cam Ranh Bay area operating as three-man teams.

Also during January 1968 one officer and five enlisted men arrived at Vũng Rô Bay to conduct advance plarming and liaison with local U. S. Army commands in preparation for establishing a Stable Door unit there. On 15 February the unit designated CTU 115.9.5 commenced limited operations, becoming fully operational on 21 February 1968.

On 15 June 1970 the Qui Nhon Stable Door Unit was turned over to Republic of Vietnam Navy (RVNN) Harbor Defense control. On 1 July 1970 the Nha Trang unit was turned over to the RVNN. On 1 September 1970 the Vung Tau unit was turned over to the RVNN.

In ceremonies conducted on 25 November 1970, the last remaining U.S. operated unit of Operation Stable Door, Unit Two at Cam Ranh Bay, was turned over to the RVNN. Thus, the last of the Inshore Undersea Warfare Group One, Western Pacific Detachments was dissolved.

== Royal Australian Navy ==
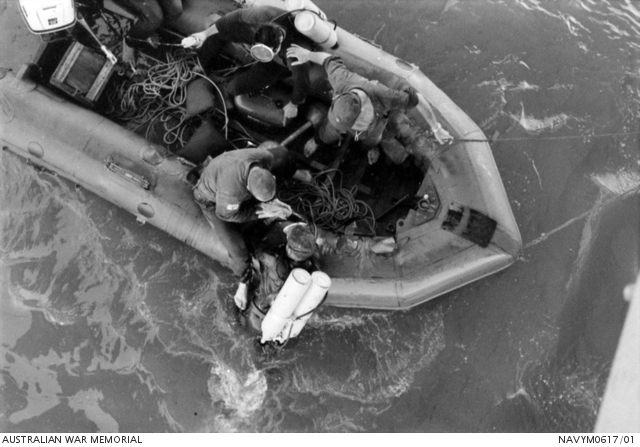
RAN Clearance Diving Team 3, work from an inflatable boat in Vung Tau Harbour, 1969

In late 1966 the Royal Australian Navy (RAN) formed Clearance Diving Team 3 comprising one officer and five sailors and they arrived in Saigon in February 1967 before moving to Vung Tau. On 18 February Clearance Diving Team 3 (EOD) reported to the Officer in Charge, IUWU 1 for duty. The team's main task was checking anchored ships for mines and disposing of booby traps and damaged ordinance. The team returned to Australia in August 1967 and were replaced by a second team. In October 1967 the team was redesignated EOD Mobile Unit (Pacific). The second team was replaced by a third team in March 1968. In August 1970 the team moved to Camp Tien Sha in Danang and assumed responsibility for naval EOD disposal across I Corps. In April 1971 the team left Danang for Saigon and on 5 May 1971 departed for Australia.

== Results ==
Inshore Undersea Warfare Group One units protected approximately 17,000 ships per year of which over 10,000 were checked by Stable Door EOD Teams. Harbor Defense Units inspected an average of 1,400 junks per month and confiscated tons of contraband. During the four years of harbor defense operations, 13 U.S. sailors were killed and another 14 wounded in action.
