= Officer in Charge of Construction RVN =

Officer in Charge of Construction, Republic of Vietnam
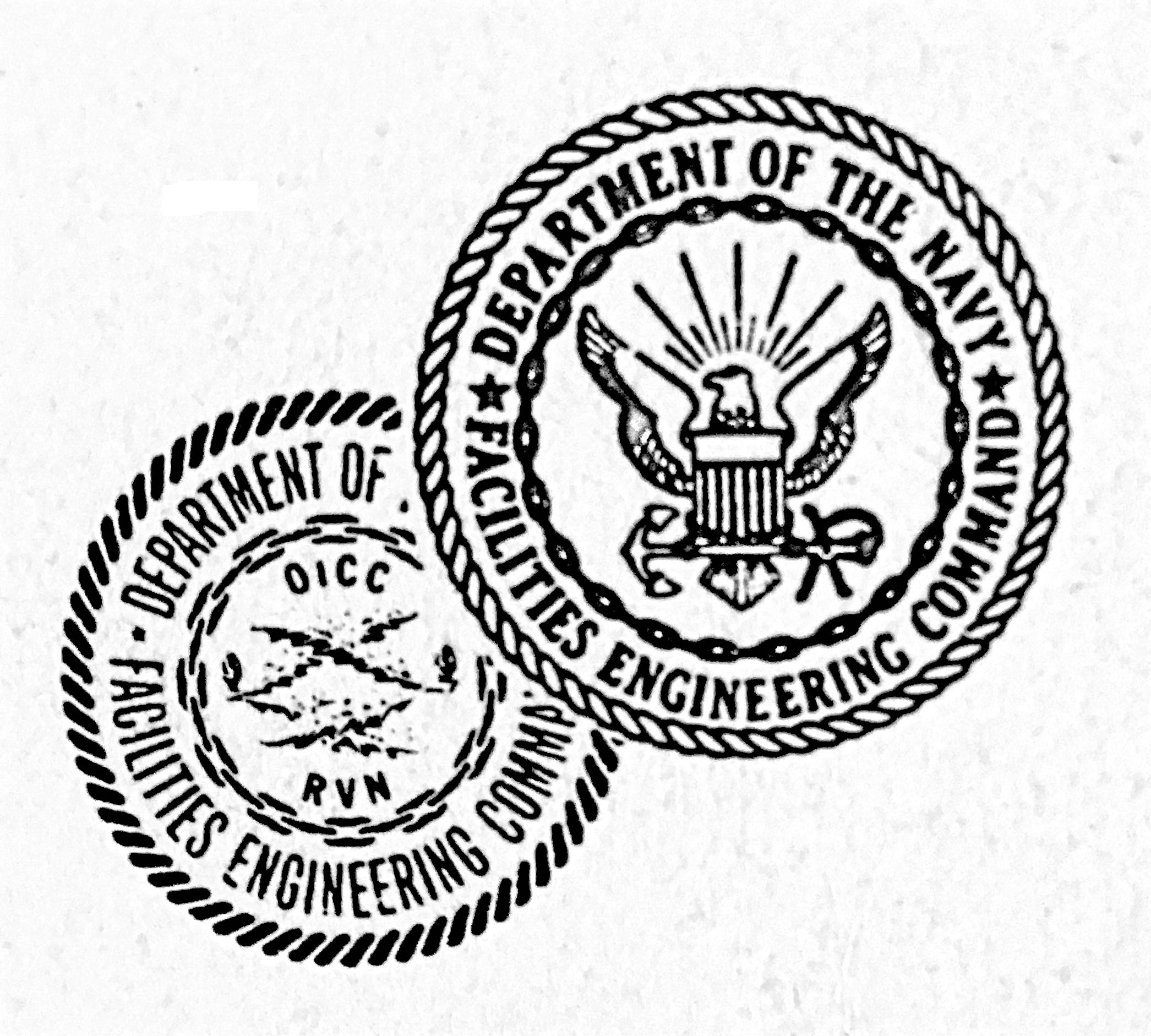
- Insignia of OICC RVN and NAVFAC
- Active: 1965-1972
- Country: United States
- Branch: U.S. Navy
- Type: Contract construction
- Role: Contracting Officer
- Part of: Naval Forces Vietnam
- Nickname: OICC RVN

Officer in Charge of Construction, Republic of Vietnam (OICC RVN), was a position established by the U.S. Navy Bureau of Yards and Docks in 1965 to manage the large construction program in South Vietnam assigned to RMK-BRJ, a consortium of four of the largest American construction companies. This construction program was to prepare the infrastructure in South Vietnam to allow escalation of U.S. troop levels into Vietnam during the Vietnam War and supply them with facilities and matériel. This program became the largest construction program and contract in history up to that time. The position ended in 1972 with the completion of the RMK-BRJ contract. The result was a transformation of southern Vietnam from an area of little infrastructure to the industrial country today that continues to rely on the new ports, airfields, highways, and bridges constructed under this program. As the journalist Richard Tregaskis put it, the bases built under this huge construction program “had the interesting collateral effect of preparing her way [Vietnam] for a catapult-style launching into the modern age.”

== History ==
In the 1950s, the United States Department of Defense assigned responsibility for contract construction in support of military assistance and military construction in regions around the world to the three major branches of defense: the Army, the Navy, and the Air Force. The Navy was assigned as the Department of Defense contract construction agent in Southeast Asia, among other regions.

The Navy established its first contracting officer in Southeast Asia with the Officer in Charge of Construction, Thailand, located in Bangkok, in December 1955, and in 1958, the name was changed to OICC Southeast Asia to encompass the construction work undergoing in Thailand, Cambodia, Laos, and Vietnam.

In response to a request from the government of South Vietnam to upgrade airports and build a new airport in Pleiku, OICC Southeast Asia established a branch office, the Resident Officer in Charge of Construction Saigon, in February 1961. Subsequently, the Navy’s Bureau of Yards and Docks (BUDOCKS) awarded a construction contract to a consortium of two of the largest American construction companies, then known as RMK, consisting of Raymond International of Delaware, Inc. and Morrison-Knudsen of Asia. BUDOCKS was renamed the Naval Facilities Engineering Command (NAVFAC) in May 1966.

After the Tonkin Gulf incident in August 1964, and the subsequent planning to introduce American combat troops into Vietnam, the construction program grew exponentially. The construction program for Vietnam became greater than that in Thailand, so the Officer in Charge of Construction, Republic of Vietnam (OICC RVN) was established in Saigon on 1 July 1965, and OICC Southeast Asia became OICC Thailand.

NAVFAC broadened the construction consortium in August 1965 by adding Brown & Root, Inc. and J.A. Jones Construction Co., Inc. The consortium then became known as RMK-BRJ.

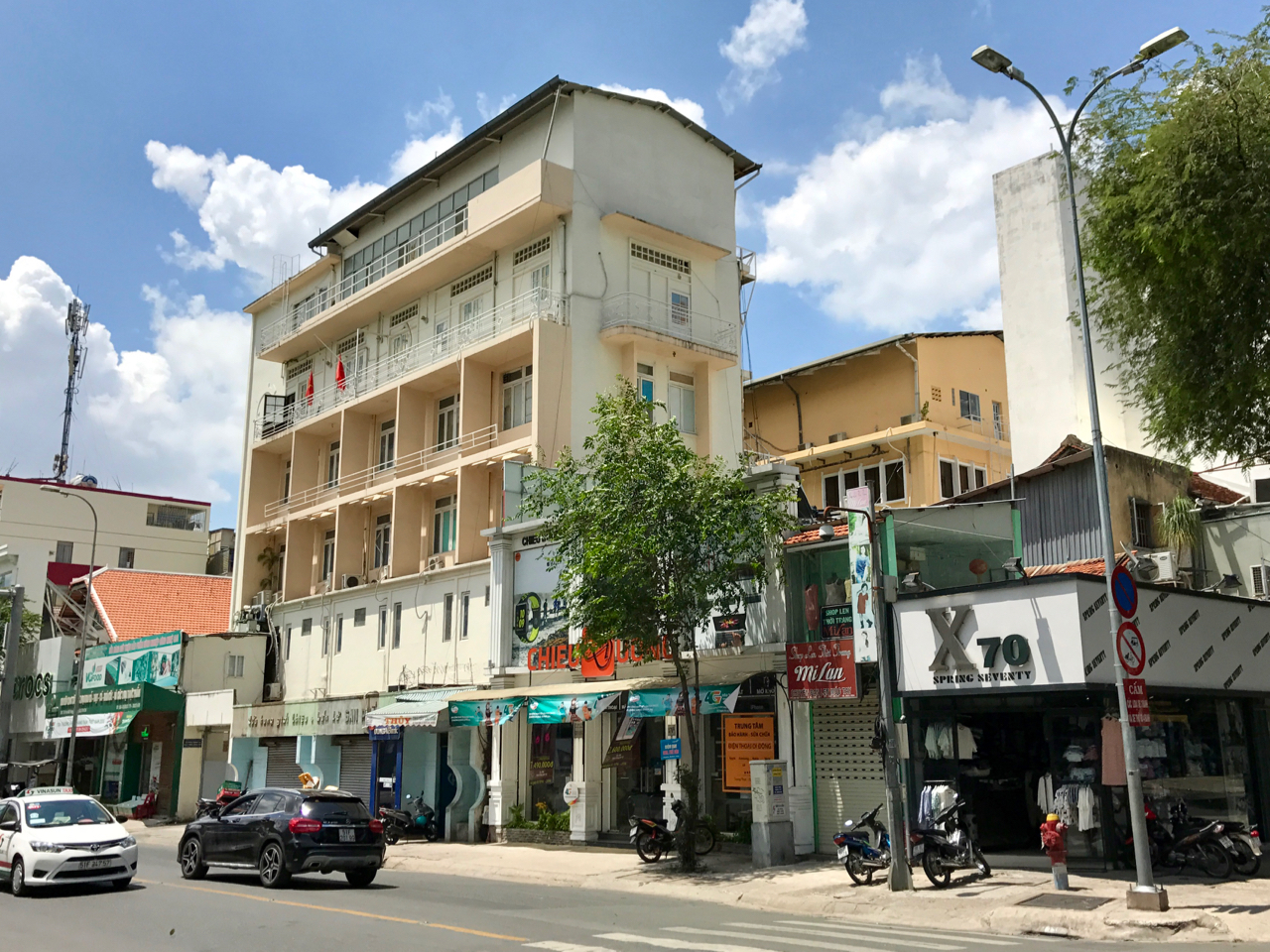
176 Hai Bà Trưng, Đa Kao, Quận 1, Hồ Chí Minh City, former OICC-RVN HQ

By February 1967, OICC RVN staff was 1,050, including 90 naval Civil Engineer Corps officers, at 47 sites with 782 separate projects. This was in response to the growth in work for RMK-BRJ, which peaked at over 51,000 employees in July 1966.

At a ceremony marking the completion of all work under the RMK-BRJ contract on 3 July 1972, Ambassador Ellsworth Bunker noted the end of a “decade of achievement.”

With increased “Vietnamization” of the war effort, OICC RVN helped to build up the Vietnamese construction industry from 1969 through 1972 by awarding fixed-price contracts to Vietnamese construction contractors. The largest of these contracts was for a 102-building Combined Arms School at Bearcat, with a contract value of $3.5 million, awarded to the Vietnamese construction contractor Tran Ngoc Tuan & Ngo The Chu Joint Venture in 1972. RMK-BRJ had trained over 200,000 Vietnamese employees over the 10-year contract in construction and administrative trades and many of these workers became the backbone of the Vietnamese construction industry.

OICC RVN was disestablished on 1 October 1972. This coincided with the contract closure report for the RMK-BRJ contract. As reported by Richard Tregaskis, “At that time, no disputes remained between the Navy and the contractor, — a remarkable achievement for a contract relationship of this nature.” The contract was closed with a value of $1.865 billion, which does not include the value of government-furnished materials, equipment, shipping, and transportation. This is the equivalent of $14 billion in 2017 dollars.

On 1 October 1972, all remaining contracts with Vietnamese construction contractors were transferred to the successor organization to OICC RVN, the Director of Construction, Republic of Vietnam, under the command of the Officer in Charge of Construction Thailand.

== Organization ==
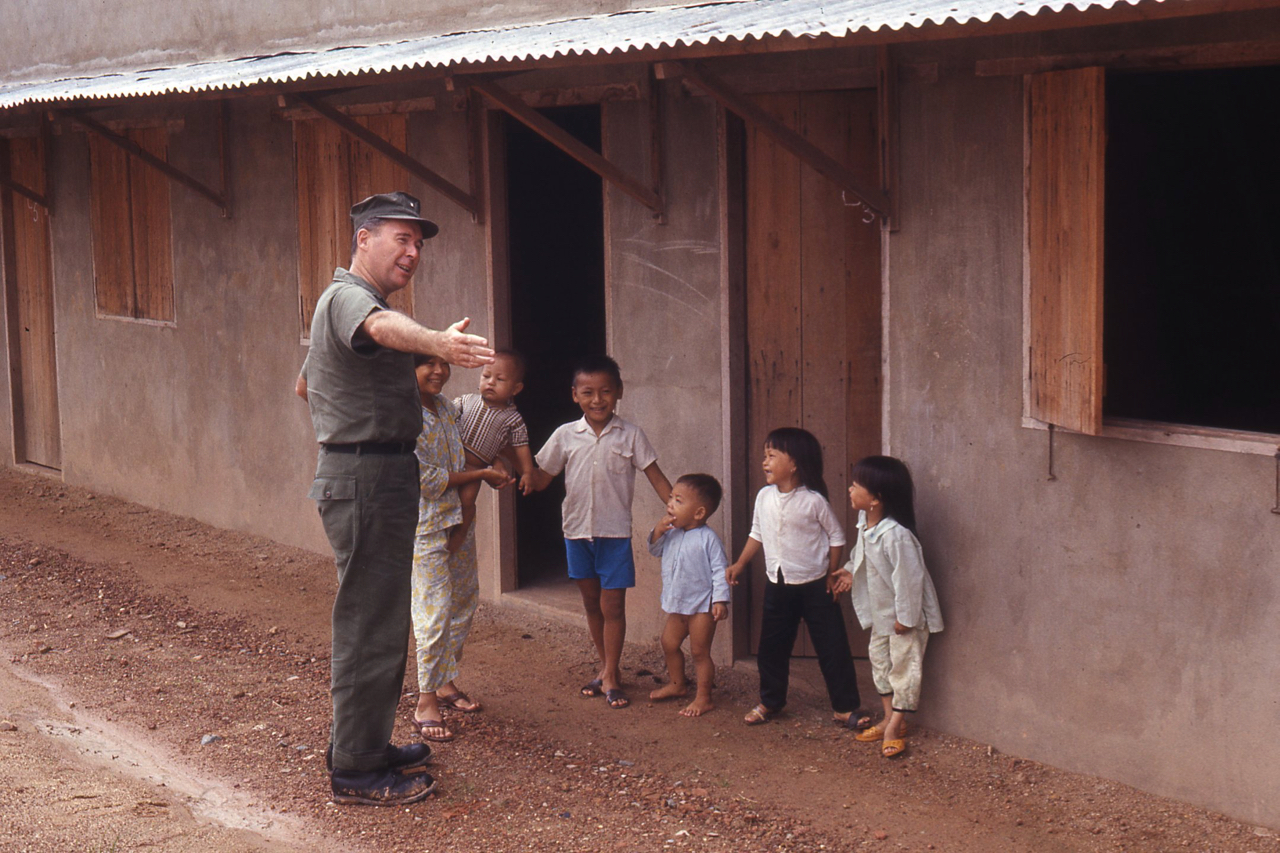
CDR E.H.Belton, CEC, USN showing housing for Vietnamese Navy families at Long Binh, Vietnam in 1972

As the Department of Defense contract construction agent in Vietnam, OICC RVN designed projects in accordance with “customer” requirements, and constructed them in accordance with the approved designs. The customers included the Military Assistance Command Vietnam (MACV), all of the branches of the U.S. military, and the United States Agency for International Development (USAID). However, customer requirements, especially for MACV, changed rapidly in response to combat conditions and strategy, which required many changes during construction. The adjudication of priorities between competing agency projects became a major concern.

In February 1966, the Directorate of Construction was formed within MACV to coordinate the overall construction program, including the efforts of military engineers and units. The Director of Construction would determine what was to be built, and release funds for design and construction. He approved what agencies did with funds, and allocated construction resources, including OICC RVN and military engineering units, in accordance with operational priorities. The Director of Construction also determined construction standards.

Thus the OICC RVN was under the operational control of the Commander, MACV, through the Commander, Naval Forces Vietnam (NAVFORV), and under the administrative control and technical supervision of NAVFAC.

== Commanders ==
The OICC RVN organization was commanded by naval officers of the Civil Engineer Corps:

- CAPT M. E. Scanlon, 7/1965-9/1965
- RADM W. M. Heaman, 9/1965-12/1965
- RADM R. R. Wooding, 12/1965-3/1966
- RADM P. E. Seufer, 3/1966-6/1967
- RADM S. R. Smith, 6/1967-7/1968
- RADM H. J. Johnson, 7/1968-3/1970
- RADM A. R. Marschall, 3/1970-3/1971
- RADM F. M. Lalor, Jr., 3/1971-3/1972
- CAPT R. F. Jortberg, 3/1972-10/1972
