= Naval Support Activity Danang =

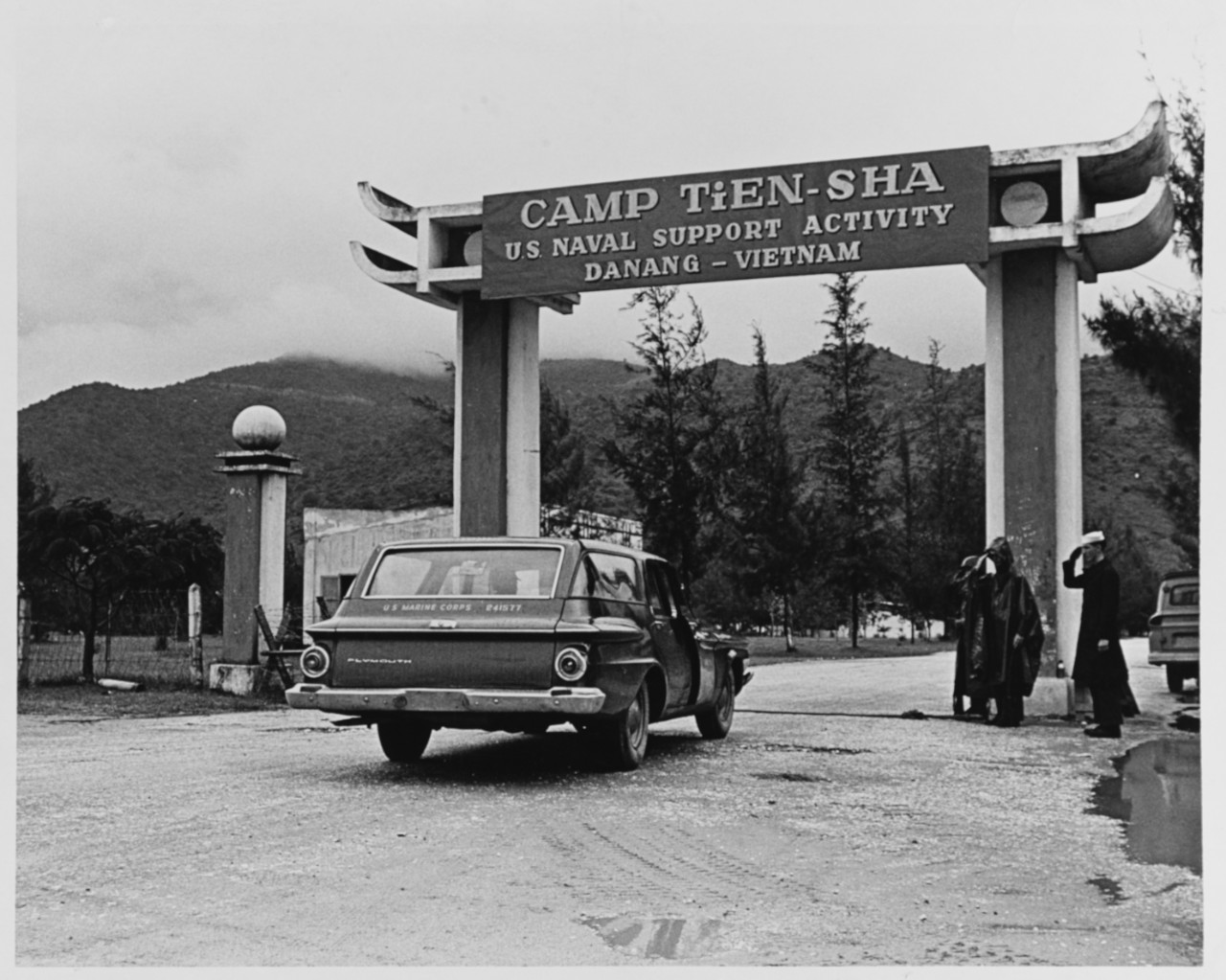
- Camp Tien Sha gate, 15 October 1965
- Active: 1965–1972
- Country: South Vietnam
- Branch: United States Navy
- Role: Logistics support
- Part of: III Marine Amphibious Force; Naval Forces Vietnam
- Garrison/HQ: Danang, South Vietnam
- Battle honours: Vietnam War

Naval Support Activity Danang or NSA Danang was a United States Navy logistics support organization located in Danang, South Vietnam, active from October 1965 to April 1972.

== History ==
In March 1965 when United States Marine Corps combat troops landed at Danang, the support establishment was rudimentary. The port of Danang contained only three small piers, three Landing Ship, Tank (LST) ramps and a stone quay that were inaccessible to oceangoing vessels; even smaller craft had trouble approaching. The scarcity of lighterage and the heavy weather that often buffeted the harbor made ship-to-craft cargo transfers hazardous and inefficient. Warehouses, open storage areas, cargo handling equipment, and good exit routes from the port were limited. From March to July 1965, III Marine Amphibious Force (III MAF) troops delivered supplies to the units in the field while the Seventh Fleet ran port operations. Soon, the fleet dispatched Naval Beach Group One Cargo Handling Battalions 1 and 2, nucleus port crew, Mine Force, Service Force, Underwater Demolition Team, and Explosive Ordnance Disposal (EOD) units to Danang. In addition, the Navy took charge of the offloading, storage and delivery of supplies common to all the allied forces in I Corps. Additional responsibilities included harbor defense and the transshipment of cargo to the smaller ports in the region. The fleet also managed logistic operations at these locations.

U.S. NSA Danang was officially established on 15 October 1965 under the operational control of Commander, III MAF. During the next several years, the command created subordinate NSA detachments at Chu Lai, Huế, Tân Mỹ, Đông Hà, Cửa Việt, Phú Bài and Sa Huỳnh. These detachments decentralized the support function and improved the logistic flow.

During 1965 the logistic operation at Danang suffered from lack of suitable or sufficient harbor craft, cargo handling equipment, and port personnel. Management and planning of the logistic flow needed refinement, as ships arrived en masse with cargo improperly stowed and packaged. Storage areas ashore were limited by space and access. Finally, the harsh northeast monsoon made cargo operations at Danang and throughout I Corps hazardous and difficult during the winter months.

In November 1965 500 men moved into the old French Army camp, Camp Tien Sha (Tiên Sa) at the foot of Monkey Mountain. The camp was quickly expanded to include 25 new barracks able to accommodate an additional 1,700 men, together with a barber shop, post exchange and milk plant. NSA Danang originally operated from a commercial pier on the city side of the Hàn River and this "Museum Ramp" (16.05°N 108.2245°E) near the Cham Museum began operation in November 1965 off-loading Landing Craft Utility (LCUs) and LSTs.

On 1 April 1966 Naval Forces Vietnam was established in Saigon and assumed control of NSA Danang from III MAF.

In July 1966 the "Bridge Cargo Ramp" (16.052°N 108.231°E) began operations increasing NSA's supply capability.

In August 1967, the headquarters of NSA Danang was moved from downtown Danang to Camp Tien Sha.

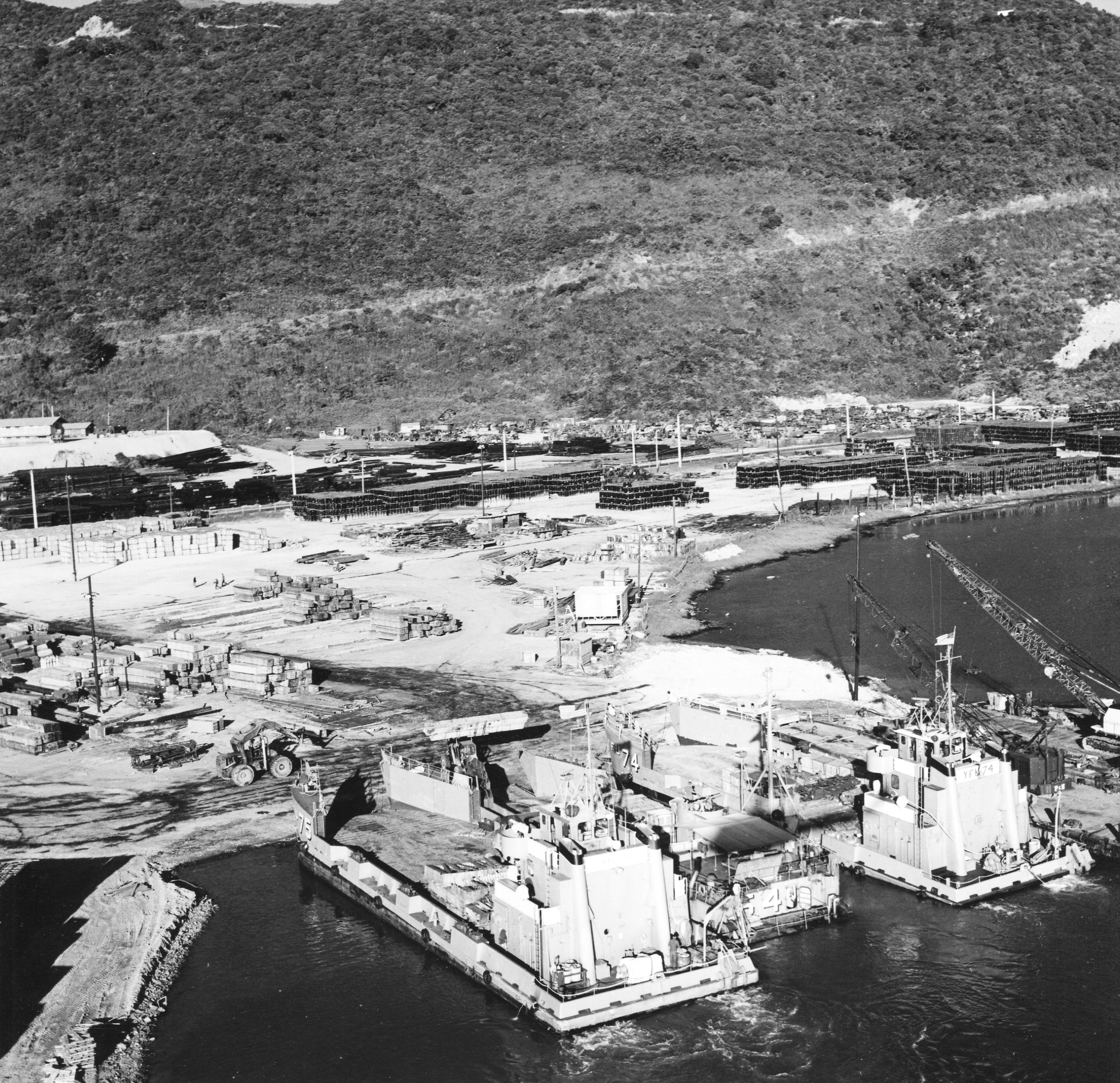
Tien Sha Ramp, February 1969

Logistic vessels under the control of NSA Danang included Landing Craft Mechanized (LCM 3 & LCM 6) and LCU landing craft; harbor utility craft (YFU); small harbor tugs (YTL); open lighters (YC); refrigerated barges (YFRN); Army craft; and a refrigerator ship. While base facilities were under construction, the fleet deployed to Danang LSTs, a Landing Ship Dock (LSD) and an Attack Transport (APA), the latter for quartering and messing NSA personnel. The harbor defense unit used landing craft, picket boats and 16 feet (4.9 m) Boston Whalers to monitor and protect the maritime traffic. A small craft repair facility and an Auxiliary Floating Drydock (AFDL) helped keep NSA vessels in working order. Over 130 rough terrain and warehouse forklifts and 20 cranes eased cargo handling.

The logistic establishment at Danang functioned with growing efficiency by mid-1968 as it built new port and shore facilities. Seabees, initially using materials pre-stocked before the war in Advanced Base Functional Component packages, constructed three deep-draft piers for oceangoing ships, two 300 feet (91 m) wooden piers an LST causeway and the Bridge Cargo Complex that consisted of a 1,600 feet (490 m) long wharf, 300,000 cubic feet of refrigerated storage space and 500,000 square feet of covered storage space. Amphibious fuel lines were laid along the sea floor to storage tanks ashore at Red Beach Base Area, north of the city and the Marines' Marble Mountain Air Facility to the south.

By July 1968 NSA Danang handled 350,000 tons of cargo each month for the 200,000 allied troops in I Corps. Danang had become the largest fuel complex in South Vietnam capable of holding over 500,000 barrels. The station hospital begun in 1965 had treated over 21,000 casualties, 44,000 nonbattle patients and one million outpatients flowing in from the hostile and disease-ridden I Corps environment.

In mid-October 1968 the Deep Water Pier complex (16.12°N 108.214°E) on the Tien Sha peninsula was completed, beginning operations in September 1968. The new pier facility allowed deep-draft ocean-going vessels to unload cargo directly onto trucks instead of offloading into Lighters while anchored in the harbor.

By 1969 NSA Danang was the Navy's largest overseas shore command and third largest supply depot after Norfolk and Oakland Naval Supply Depot and Camp Tien Sha had grown to accommodate over 6000 personnel.

On 27 February 1969 a People's Army of Vietnam rocket hit LCU-1500 while it was loading at the Bridge Cargo Ramp killing 13 crewmen.

On 30 June 1970 NSA Danang was deactivated and on 1 July new Army-Marine service support agreements went into effect.

In April 1972 all US Navy facilities in Danang were transferred to the Republic of Vietnam Navy.
