= Military Assistance Command, Vietnam =

Joint-service command of the US Dept. of Defense in South Vietnam (1962-73)

U.S. Military Assistance Command, Vietnam
- U.S. Military Assistance Command, Vietnam shoulder sleeve insignia
- Active: 1962–1973
- Country: United States of America
- Part of: United States Pacific Command
- Garrison/HQ: Tan Son Nhut Airport, South Vietnam
- Nickname: "MACV"
- Decorations: Presidential Unit Citation; Gallantry Cross (Vietnam) with Palm
- Battle honours: Vietnam: Advisory 1962–1965; Defense 1965; Counteroffensive 1965–1966; Counteroffensive, Phase II 1966–1967; Counteroffensive, Phase III 1967–1968; TET Counteroffensive 1968; Counteroffensive, Phase IV 1968; Counteroffensive, Phase V 1968; Counteroffensive, Phase VI 1968–1969; TET 69/Counteroffensive 1969; Summer–Fall 1969; Winter–Spring 1970; Sanctuary Counteroffensive 1970; Counteroffensive, Phase VII 1970–1971; Consolidation I 1971; Consolidation II 1971–1972; Easter Offensive 1972; Cease-Fire 1972–1973

Commanders
- Notable commanders: Paul D. Harkins; William C. Westmoreland; Creighton W. Abrams; Frederick C. Weyand

The U.S. Military Assistance Command, Vietnam (MACV) was a joint-service command of the United States Department of Defense, composed of forces from the United States Army, United States Navy, and United States Air Force, as well as their respective special operations forces.

MACV was created on 8 February 1962, in response to the increase in United States military assistance to South Vietnam. MACV was implemented to assist and oversee the Military Assistance Advisory Group (MAAG) Vietnam while the Viet Cong insurgency was under way. It was reorganized on 15 May 1964 and absorbed MAAG Vietnam when the deployment of combat units became too large for the advisory group to control.

General Paul D. Harkins was the first commanding general of MACV (COMUSMACV), and was previously the commander of MAAG Vietnam. After reorganization he was succeeded by General William Westmoreland in June 1964, followed by General Creighton W. Abrams (July 1968) and General Frederick C. Weyand (June 1972).

MACV was disestablished on 29 March 1973 and replaced by the Defense Attaché Office (DAO), Saigon. The DAO performed many of the same roles of MACV within the restrictions imposed by the Paris Peace Accords until the Fall of Saigon.

== Establishment and growth ==
Admiral Harry D. Felt, Commander-in-Chief, Pacific, established the U.S. Military Assistance Command, Vietnam, on 8 February 1962, as a subordinate unified command under his control. Lieutenant General Paul D. Harkins, the Deputy Commander in Chief, U.S. Army, Pacific, who, as the commander-designate for the task force headquarters (HQ) in the event of operations in Southeast Asia, had participated in the planning for such operations, was appointed commander and promoted to general.

Harkins became the senior U.S. military commander in South Vietnam and responsible for U.S. military policy, operations and assistance there. Harkins had the task of advising the South Vietnamese government on security, organization, and employment of their military and paramilitary forces. As provided for in the organization of the task force headquarters in the contingency plans, MACV's commander was also his own Army component commander. With an initial authorized strength of 216 men (113 Army), MACV was envisaged as a temporary HQ that would be withdrawn once the Viet Cong insurgency was brought under control. In that event, the Military Assistance Advisory Group would be restored to its former position as the principal U.S. headquarters in South Vietnam. For this reason, the MAAG was retained as a separate headquarters.

In March 1962 Headquarters, United States Army Pacific, removed the "provisional" designation from the U.S. Army Support Group, Vietnam, attached it to United States Army Ryukyu Islands for administrative and logistical support, and made its commanding officer the deputy Army component commander under MACV. All U.S. Army units in South Vietnam, excluding advisory attachments, were assigned to the Army Support Group for administrative and logistical needs. Over the course of 1962 U.S. military strength in South Vietnam rose from about 1,000 to over 11,000 personnel. Each service continued to provide its own logistical support.

Throughout 1963 the duties of the U.S. Army Support Group steadily increased, particularly regarding to combat support activities and logistics. During the year, the U.S. buildup continued, especially in aviation, communications, intelligence, special warfare and logistic units, reaching a total of 17,068 men, of which 10,916 were Army. Because of this expansion, the commanding general, General Joseph Warren Stilwell Jr. late in 1963 proposed that the name of the support group be changed to U.S. Army Support Command, Vietnam. Harkins concurred and General James Francis Collins, commander of United States Army, Pacific and Admiral Felt approved the redesignation. The new designation went into effect on 1 March 1964.

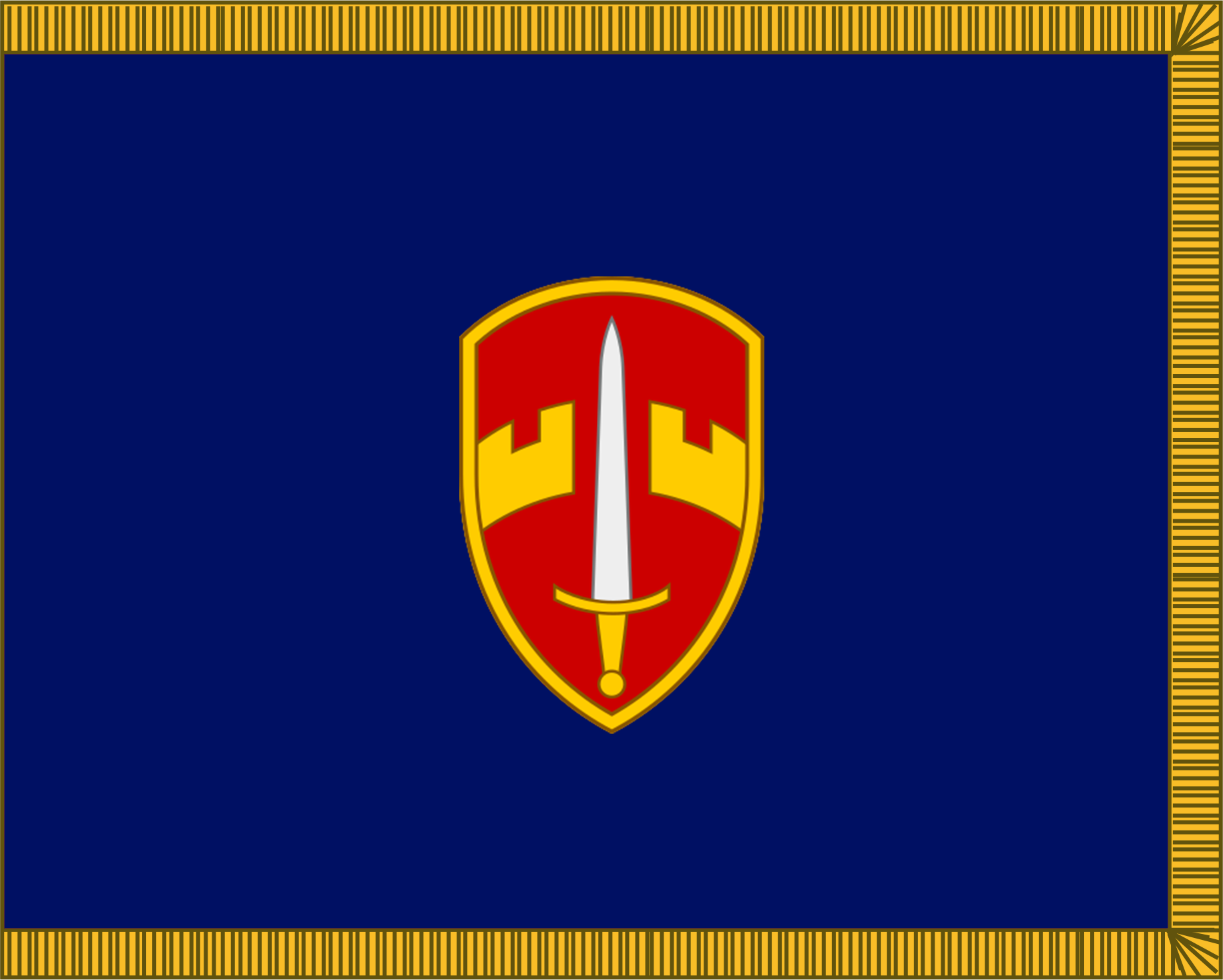
Military Assistance Command Vietnam Flag

MACV was reorganized on 15 May 1964, and absorbed MAAG Vietnam within it, when combat unit deployment became too large for advisory group control. A Naval Advisory Group was established and the Commanding General, 2nd Air Division, became MACV's Air Force component commander. That year the U.S. strength in Vietnam grew from about 16,000 men (10,716 Army) to about 23,300 (16,000 Army) in 1964. Logistic support operations were highly fragmented. As a result, the 1st Logistics Command was established.

Large scale combat deployments began when the 9th Marine Expeditionary Brigade was deployed in the Da Nang area from March 1965. When the III Marine Amphibious Force moved to Da Nang on 6 May 1965, its commanding general, Major General William R. Collins, was designated MACV's naval component commander. In May 1965, the Army's 173d Airborne Brigade from Okinawa arrived. In July 1965, in response to the growing size of U.S. Army forces in the country, United States Army, Vietnam was established, and both the 2nd Brigade, 1st Infantry Division as well as the 1st Brigade, 101st Airborne Division, deployed from the United States.

The brigade from the 101st Airborne Division was originally planned to replace the 173d Airborne Brigade but, with the need for additional combat forces, both brigades remained in South Vietnam. Two months later, the 1st Cavalry Division (Airmobile), recently reorganized from an infantry formation, reported in country, and the rest of the 1st Infantry Division arrived in October.

Two corps-level HQs were established in 1965 and 1966, Task Force Alpha (soon to become I Field Force, Vietnam) for U.S. forces in the II Corps Tactical Zone and II Field Force, Vietnam, for U.S. Army forces in the III Corps Tactical Zone. The 5th Special Forces Group was also established in-country by 1965. A brigade of the 25th Infantry Division arrived in late 1965, with the 4th Infantry Division deploying between August and November 1966. The 11th Armored Cavalry Regiment was alerted for assignment to Southeast Asia on 11 March 1966.

In April 1967, General Westmoreland, who had arrived in June 1964 as Commander of MACV, organized a division-sized blocking force along the border between North and South Vietnam. The deployment of a division-sized U.S. Army force would allow the 1st Marine Division to move north, to provide greater support for the 3rd Marine Division in the northern portion of the I Corps Tactical Zone. Designated as Task Force Oregon, it included the 196th Infantry Brigade; the 3rd Brigade, 25th Infantry Division at Chu Lai Base Area; and the 1st Brigade, 10lst Airborne Division. On 25 September 1967 the 23rd Infantry (Americal) Division was activated to control the blocking force, replacing the provisional task force HQ. With the elapse of five months, all the three same brigades remained in the new division, but the brigade at Chu Lai was now named the 3rd Brigade, 4th Infantry Division, after a responsibility swap that had occurred in August.

In April 1966, all Army communications-electronics resources in South Vietnam were combined in a single formation, the 1st Signal Brigade. It supported the combat signal battalions of the divisions and field forces in each corps area. The 1st Signal Brigade operated the many elements of the Defense Communications System in South Vietnam. To improve co-ordination and management of communications-electronics assets, the brigade commander served as the U.S. Army, Vietnam, staff adviser on all matters pertaining to Army communications-electronics.

On 24 January 1968, General Westmoreland "cabled to Admiral Sharp a recommendation that the Commander in Chief, Pacific (CINCPAC), and MACV begin contingency planning for the use of tactical nuclear weapons in northern Quang Tri if necessary to prevent a major defeat. He noted that in the uninhabited mountains around Khe Sanh, such weapons could be used with great effect and with "negligible" civilian casualties. Sharp on the thirtieth accepted Westmoreland's proposal and ordered planners from MACV and CINCPAC's component commands to meet on Okinawa on 1 February. Assigning the project the code-name Fracture Jaw, Sharp told all concerned to "bear in mind the very sensitive nature" of the planning and to restrict knowledge of it to as few people as possible on an "absolutely essential need to know basis." Planning began in January 1968 to move nuclear weapons into South Vietnam so that they could be used on short notice against North Vietnamese troops. However planning quickly ceased after the effort became public in the United States in February.

=== Naval Forces, Vietnam ===
In contrast to the carrier, amphibious, and naval gunfire support forces and, at least during early 1965, the coastal patrol force, which Commander Seventh Fleet directed, the Navy's forces within South Vietnam were operationally controlled by COMUSMACV. Initially, Westmoreland exercised this command through the Chief, Naval Advisory Group. However, the increasing demands of the war required a distinct operational rather than an advisory headquarters for naval units. As a result, on 1 April 1966, Naval Forces Vietnam, was established to control the Navy's units in the II, III and IV Corps Tactical Zones. This eventually included the major combat formations: Coastal Surveillance Force (Task Force 115), River Patrol Force (Task Force 116) and Riverine Assault Force (Task Force 117). The latter unit formed the naval component of the joint Army-Navy Mobile Riverine Force.

Commander Naval Forces, Vietnam (COMNAVFORV) also controlled the Naval Support Activity Saigon (NSA Saigon), which supplied naval forces in the II, III and IV Corps areas. Naval Support Activity Danang (NSA Danang), provided logistic support to all American forces in I Corps, where the predominant Marine presence demanded a naval supply establishment. NSA Danang was under the operational control of Commander III Marine Amphibious Force.

== MACV component commands ==
Major component commands of MACV were:

- United States Army, Vietnam (USARV)
- I Field Force, Vietnam (I FFV)
- II Field Force, Vietnam (II FFV)
- XXIV Corps
- III Marine Amphibious Force (III MAF)
- Naval Forces, Vietnam (NAVFORV)
- Seventh Air Force (7AF)
- 5th Special Forces Group
- Civil Operations and Rural Development Support (CORDS)
- Studies and Observations Group (MACV-SOG)
- Field Advisory Element, MACV

== Commanders ==
The "Commander, U.S. Military Assistance Command, Vietnam" was known by the abbreviation COMUSMACV (/ˌkɒm.juːɛsˌmækˈviː/ "com-U.S.-mack-vee"). COMUSMACV was in one sense the top person in charge of the U.S. military on the Indochinese peninsula; however, in reality, the CINCPAC and the U.S. ambassadors to Vietnam, Laos, and Cambodia also had "top person in charge" status with regard to various aspects of the war's strategy.

Officers who served as COMUSMACV
General Paul D. Harkins	1962–64
General William C. Westmoreland	1964–68
General Creighton Abrams	1968–72
General Frederick C. Weyand	1972–73

== MACV Headquarters/DAO Compound ==
The original MACV Headquarters were colocated with MAAG at 606 Trần Hưng Đạo, Cholon. In May 1962 it moved to 137 Pasteur Street (10°46′58.25″N 106°41′35.94″E) in central Saigon. The Trần Hưng Đạo site subsequently became the headquarters of Republic of Korea armed forces in Vietnam.

As the U.S. military presence in South Vietnam grew, MACV quickly outgrew the Pasteur Street quarters and expanded into a proliferating number of buildings throughout downtown Saigon. This added to the command's existing security vulnerabilities and communications difficulties. In March 1965, Westmoreland began a search for a new location large enough to accommodate the entire headquarters. He initially tried to obtain a site between the ARVN Joint General Staff compound and Tan Son Nhut Airport, desirable from the standpoint of removing Americans from central Saigon and placing MACV conveniently close to its Vietnamese counterpart.

The Vietnamese government refused to turn over the most suitable location, a soccer field (10°48′45.62″N 106°39′57.49″E) near the civilian air terminal, allegedly because Premier Nguyễn Cao Kỳ wanted to keep the property for a postwar tourist hotel. In late April 1966, with the Saigon regime locked in a tense confrontation with Buddhist and ARVN rebels in I Corps, Ambassador Henry Cabot Lodge Jr. and Westmoreland reopened the effort to acquire the Tan Son Nhut soccer field. Under their combined pressure, Kỳ gave way.

On 2 July 1966 the construction of a purpose-built building began. It was designed and constructed under the supervision of the U.S. Navy Officer in Charge of Construction RVN. The construction contractor was RMK-BRJ, at a cost of $25 million. MACV occupied its new headquarters early in August 1967. The new complex soon earned the nickname "Pentagon East."

The air-conditioned complex of two-story prefabricated buildings, a little more than a third the size of its Washington namesake, included twelve acres of enclosed office space. In addition to the headquarters offices, the complex included a barracks, a mess hall, a refrigerated storage building and its own power plant and telephone exchange. Inside, according to one staff officer, "the well-waxed corridors had the fluorescent feel of an airport terminal." A cyclone fence, topped with barbed wire and with watch towers at intervals, provided close-in protection.

Following the closure of MACV and the establishment of the DAO, the MACV Headquarters became the DAO Compound.

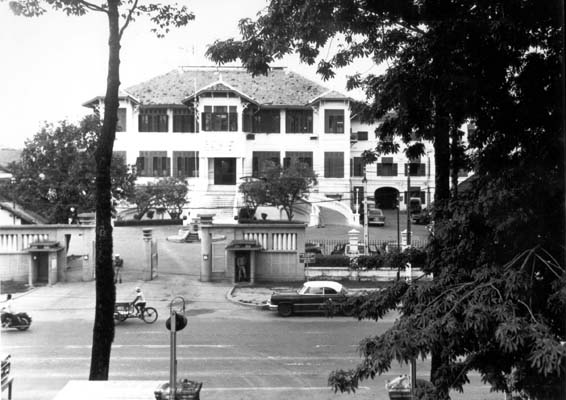
Original MACV HQ, 606 Trần Hưng Đạo, Cholon, Saigon

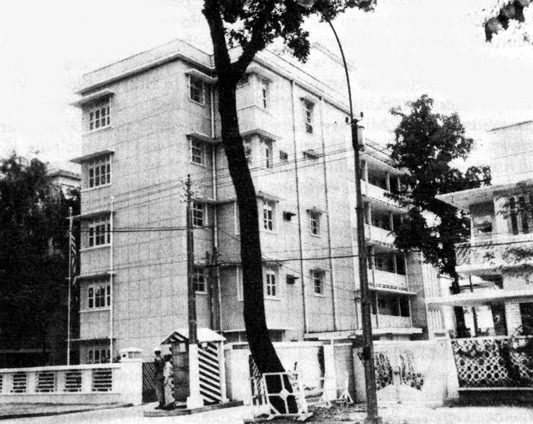
Entrance to second MACV HQ, 137 Pasteur St, Saigon

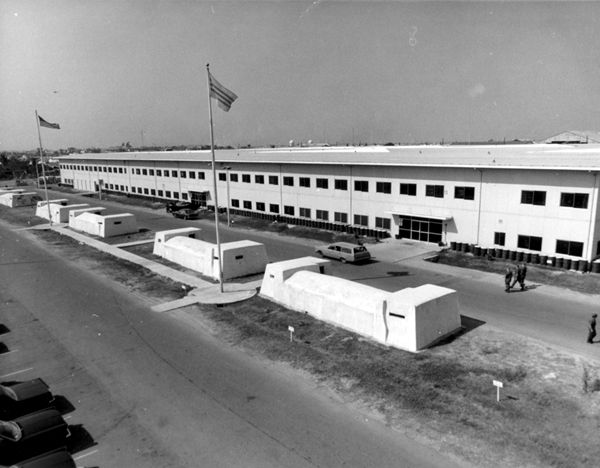
MACV Headquarters ("Pentagon East") at Tan Son Nhut, 1969

== Inactivation ==
Under the terms of the Paris Peace Accords MACV and all American and third country forces had to be withdrawn from South Vietnam within 60 days of the ceasefire. A small U.S. military headquarters was needed to continue the military assistance program for the southern Republic of Vietnam Military Forces and supervise the technical assistance still required to complete the goals of Vietnamization. This headquarters became the Defense Attaché Office, Saigon. That headquarters also reported operational and military intelligence through military channels to DOD authorities.

A multi-service organization was required to plan for the application of U.S. air and naval power into North or South Vietnam, Cambodia or Laos, should this be required and ordered. Called the United States Support Activities Group & 7th Air Force (USSAG/7th AF), it was located at Nakhon Phanom Royal Thai Air Force Base in northeast Thailand.

The advance echelon of USSAG/7AF moved from Tan Son Nhut Air Base to Nakhon Phanom on 29 January 1973. Transfer of the main body, drawn largely from the operations and intelligence sections of MACV and Seventh Air Force, began on 10 February. USSAG was activated on 11 February 1973 under the command of commander of MACV. At 08:00 on 15 February, USAF General John W. Vogt Jr., as USSAG/7AF commander, took over from MACV control of American air operations. U.S. air support operations into Cambodia continued under USSAG/7th AF until August 1973.

The DAO was established as a subsidiary command of MACV and remained under the command of commander of MACV until the deactivation of MACV on 27 March 1973. Command then passed to the Commander USSAG/Seventh Air Force at Nakhon Phanom. The DAO was activated on 28 January 1973 with United States Army Major General John E. Murray, formerly MACV director of logistics, as the Defense Attaché and United States Air Force Brigadier General Ralph J. Maglione, formerly the MACV J-1 (Director for Manpower and Personnel), as deputy Defense Attaché.

By 29 March, the only American military personnel left in South Vietnam were the U.S. delegates to the Four-Party Joint Military Commission established under the Paris Peace Accords to oversee the ceasefire, themselves in the process of winding up work and departing; the fifty man DAO military contingent; and a 143-man Marine Security Guard. At 11:00 on the 29th, in a simple ceremony, General Weyand furled the colors of the Military Assistance Command, Vietnam, and formally inactivated it.

== See also ==
- Free World Military Assistance Forces
