= List of allied military operations of the Vietnam War (1970) =

This article is a list of known military operations of the Vietnam War in 1970, conducted by the armed forces of the Republic of Vietnam, the Khmer Republic, the United States and their allies.

| Date Duration | Operation Name | Unit(s) – Description | Location | VC–PAVN KIAs | Allied KIAs |
|---|---|---|---|---|---|
| 70 | Operation Lunch | Second phase of Operation Menu | Cambodia | | |
| 70 | Operation Snack | Third phase of Operation Menu | Cambodia | | |
| 70 | Operation Dinner | Fourth phase of Operation Menu | Cambodia | | |
| 70 | Operation Dessert | Fifth phase of Operation Menu | Cambodia | | |
| 70 | Operation Supper | Sixth phase of Operation Menu | Cambodia | | |
| 70–73 | Operation Good Luck | USAF bombing of PAVN and Pathet Lao forces | Plain of Jars in northern Laos | | |
| Jan 1 – 7 | Operation Leopard | A Squadron, 1st Armoured Regiment reconnaissance and ambush operation | Duc Thanh District | | |
| Jan 4 – 11 | Operation Cliff Dweller IV | 1st Brigade, 25th Infantry Division operation | Nui Ba Den (Black Virgin Mountain), Tây Ninh Province | | |
| Jan 4 - 30 | Operation Wayne Thrust | 1st Brigade, 4th Infantry Division clear and search operation | Bình Định Province | | |
| Jan 5 – 8 | Operation Flying Finn | 2nd Battalion, 5th Cavalry Regiment operation against the 2nd Battalion, NVA 95C Regiment | Tây Ninh Province | | |
| Jan 10 – Mar 10 | Operation Napier | 6th Battalion, Royal Australian Regiment/Royal New Zealand Infantry Regiment (ANZAC) cordon and search and reconnaissance and ambush operation | Ngãi Giao, Đồng Nai Province | | |
| Jan 15 – 26 | Operation Matilda | 5th Battalion, Royal Australian Regiment, B Company 6th Battalion, Royal Australian Regiment/W Company Royal New Zealand Infantry Regiment, A Squadron 1st Armoured Regiment reconnaissance and ambush operations with South Vietnamese Regional and Popular Forces | Phước Tuy Province | | |
| Jan 18 – Feb 7 | Operation Putnam Power | 1st Battalion, 8th Infantry Regiment, 1st Battalion, 12th Infantry Regiment and 1st Battalion, 22nd Infantry Regiment clear and search operation | Bình Định Province | | |
| Jan 19 – Mar 15 | Operation Bull Run II | 5th Special Forces Group and 3rd Mike Force reconnaissance in force operation | Phước Long Province | | |
| Jan 19 – Jul | Operation Green River | 1st Infantry Brigade, 5th Infantry Division operation to continue search and clear, reconnaissance in force, search and clear operations, and measures against VC rockets | Quảng Trị Province | 400 | 22 |
| Jan 26 – Feb 14 | Operation Keperra | 8th Battalion, Royal Australian Regiment cordon and search operation of selected hamlets of Xuyen Moc and the village of Nui Nhon, reconnaissance and ambush operation | Nui Dinh mountains, eastern Phước Tuy Province | 6 | |
| Jan 29 – Apr 30 | Operation Fresh Start | 11th Armored Cavalry Regiment land clearing operation along Route 246 | Tây Ninh Province | | |
| Jan 30 – Mar 11 | Operation Putnam Shark | 1st Battalion, 8th Infantry Regiment, 1st Battalion, 12th Infantry Regiment and 1st and 2nd Battalions, 35th Infantry Regiment clear and search operation | Bình Định Province | | |
| Jan 30 - Mar 16 | Operation Wayne Stab | 1st Brigade, 4th Infantry Division clear and search operation | Bình Định Province | | |
| Jan 30 – Mar 17 | Operation Greene Deuce | 3rd Battalion, 12th Infantry Regiment and 1st Squadron, 10th Cavalry Regiment operation | Pleiku Province | | |
| Jan 30 – Apr 16 | Operation York Market | 1st Brigade 5th Infantry Division, 1st Battalion 77th Armor and Regional Forces combined reconnaissance in force, search and clear, security, rice denial, and saturation ambush patrolling operation | southwest of Rai Truong, Hải Lăng District | 20 | |
| Feb 1 – Apr 15 | Operation Keystone Blue Jay | 1st Infantry Division and 3rd Brigade, 4th Infantry Division redeployment from South Vietnam to the United States | | | |
| Feb 10 – Mar 9 | Operation Hammersley (the Battle for the "Long Hais") | 8th Battalion, Royal Australian Regiment reconnaissance and ambush operation in the western side of the Long Hải Hills to protect quarry operations being undertaken by 17 Construction Squadron, to establish Fire Support Base Isa and ambush likely VC routes leading from the hills | Long Hải Hills | 42 | 12 Australians |
| Feb 10 – Mar 29 | Operation Dakota Clint | 1st Battalion 11th Infantry and Regional Forces formed integrated infantry companies and recon/killer teams combined reconnaissance in force to ensure security of the villages, night ambush and search and clear operations | Mai Loc | 19 | 2 ARVN |
| Feb 28 – Mar 10 | Operation Gisborne | 6th Battalion, Royal Australian Regiment/Royal New Zealand Infantry Regiment (ANZAC) reconnaissance in force operation east of Nui Dat | Phước Tuy Province | | |
| Mar 1 – Nov 17 | Operation Park Silver | 1st Squadron, 10th Cavalry Regiment and 2nd Battalion 503rd Airborne Infantry Regiment security operation. Later redesignated Operation Hancock Dragon | Pleiku Province | | |
| Mar 3 – 24 | Operation Hamilton | 8th Battalion, Royal Australian Regiment search and destroy operation | Xuyên Mộc District | | |
| Mar 9 – Apr 7 | Operation Finschhafen | 7th Battalion, Royal Australian Regiment reconnaissance and ambush operation | east of Nui Dat, Phước Tuy Province | | |
| Mar 11 – 18 | Operation Earhart White | 1st and 2nd Brigades, 4th Infantry Division operation | Bình Định Province | | |
| Mar 12 – Apr 21 | Operation Darby Talon | 173rd Airborne Brigade and 3rd Battalion, 503rd Airborne Infantry operation | Phú Yên Province | | |
| Mar 20 – Apr 30 | Operation Eichelberger Black | 1st and 2nd Brigades, 4th Infantry Division operation | Bình Định Province | | |
| Mar 23 - Apr 24 | Operation Townsville | 6th Battalion, Royal Australian Regiment/Royal New Zealand Infantry Regiment (ANZAC) reconnaissance in force operation | northeast Phước Tuy Province | | |
| Apr 1 – May 31 | Operation Patio | Covert USAF aerial interdiction | eastern Cambodia | | |
| Apr 1 – Sep 5 | Operation Texas Star | 101st Airborne Division and ARVN 1st Division operation in the A Shau Valley culminating in the Battle of Fire Support Base Ripcord. Later phases renamed Operation Jefferson Glenn | A Shau Valley | 1728 | 416 |
| Apr 3 – May 3 | Operation Tat Thang 18 | ARVN 24th Special Tactical Zone reconnaissance operation using elements of the 1st Ranger Group and 42nd, 45th and 47th Regiments | north of Dak Saeng, Kon Tum Province | | |
| Apr 7 – 19 | Operation Phoi Hop | 3rd Battalion, Royal Australian Regiment security operation | villages of Hoa Long, Suối Nghê, Duc My and Bình Ba | 11 | |
| Apr 14 - 17 | Operation Toan Thang 41 | 3rd Brigade, 25th Infantry Division, ARVN 49th Regiment, 31st, 36th and 52nd Ranger Battalions and 10th and 18th Armored Cavalry operation against a PAVN logistics and rest area | Angel's Wing, Svay Rieng Province, Cambodia | 378 | |
| Apr 19 – May 7 | Operation Concrete I | 7th Battalion, Royal Australian Regiment and 8 RAR operation to establish blocking positions while 6 RAR/Royal New Zealand Infantry Regiment reconnoitered in force towards these ambush positions | east of Phước Tuy Province | | |
| Apr 20 – June 11 | Operation Nudgee | 6th Battalion, Royal Australian Regiment/Royal New Zealand Infantry Regiment (ANZAC), 7th Battalion, Royal Australian Regiment, 8th Battalion, Royal Australian Regiment, A Squadron, 1st Armoured Regiment and B Squadron, 3rd Cavalry Regiment reconnaissance and ambush operation | Xuyên Mộc and Đất Đỏ Districts | 26 | 4 |
| Apr 24 - 29 | Operation Patio | USAF B-52 bombing operations that succeeded Operation Menu and preceded Operation Freedom Deal | eastern Cambodia | | |
| Apr 24 – May 4 | Operation Baird Silver | 4th Infantry Division search and destroy operation | Kon Tum and Pleiku Provinces | | |
| Apr 29 – May 1 | Operation Rock Crusher I | ARVN 9th Division operation supported by the 164th Aviation Group, 1st Aviation Brigade | Parrot's Beak, Svay Rieng Province, Cambodia | 502 | 56 |
| Apr 29 - May 2 | Operation Toan Thang 42 | ARVN (two armored cavalry squadrons from III Corps and two from the 25th Division and 5th Division, an infantry regiment from the 25th Division, and four Ranger battalions from the 2nd Ranger Group) and US 1st Cavalry Division, 9th Infantry Division and 11th Armored Cavalry Regiment operation against the Parrot's Beak to target the NVA/VC base areas 367 and 706 | Parrot's Beak, Svay Rieng Province, Cambodia | 12,354 | 434 US, 66 ARVN |
| Apr 30 – May 4 | Operation Plateau | 2nd Brigade, 4th Infantry Division operation | Bình Định Province | | |
| Apr 30 – May 4 | Operation Platte Canyon | 1st Brigade, 101st Airborne Division, 7th Cavalry Regiment and ARVN 54th Regiment reconnaissance in force | Ruong Ruong Valley south of Phu Bai | | |
| May - Jul | Operation Toan Thang 46 | ARVN 5th Division operation to attack and destroy the NVA 70th and 80th Rear Service Groups | Fishhook, Kampong Cham Province, Cambodia | 79 | |
| May 1 – June 26 | Operation Dong Tien II/Operation Toan Thang 43 | 1st Infantry Division and 11th Armored Cavalry Regiment operation | Cambodia | | |
| May 1 - June 29 | Operation Toan Thang 43 | 2nd Brigade, 1st Cavalry Division, 11th Armored Cavalry Regiment and ARVN Airborne Division operation to undermine the PAVN logistics system and to forestall any major PAVN offensives | Fishhook, Kampong Cham Province, Cambodia | | |
| May 2 – 6 | Operation Rock Crusher II | ARVN 9th Division operation supported by the 164th Aviation Group, 1st Aviation Brigade | Parrot's Beak, Svay Rieng Province, Cambodia | 1202 | 70 |
| May 4 – 14 | Operation Bold Lancer I | 1st Brigade, 25th Infantry Division search and destroy operation | Cambodia | | |
| May 4 – 25 | Operation Binh Tay I | Phase I of the Cambodian Incursion. 4th Infantry Division, 3rd Battalion 506th Airborne, ARVN 40th Regiment, 22nd Division, 2nd Ranger Group, 23rd Division and 2nd Armored Brigade search and destroy operation against the PAVN B-3 Front | Fishhook and Parrot's Beak areas of Kampong Cham and Svay Rieng Provinces, eastern Cambodia | | |
| May 5 – 9 | Operation Cavalier Beach | Transfer of command of I Corps from III MAF to XXIV Corps. XXIV Corps Headquarters moved from Phu Bai to Camp Horn. III MAF moved to Camp Hawkins | | | |
| May 6 - 14 | Operation Toan Thang 44 | 1st and 2nd Brigades, 25th Infantry Division, 11th Armored Cavalry Regiment and ARVN Airborne Division operation against PAVN Base Areas 353, 354, and 707 | north and northeast of Tây Ninh | 1017 | 119 |
| May 6 - June 27 | Operation Toan Thang 45 | 3/1 Cavalry and 5th Battalion, 12th Infantry Regiment operation against PAVN Base Areas 350 and 351 | northern borders of Bình Long and Phước Long Provinces | 1017 | 119 |
| May 7 - 12 | Operation Toan Thang 500 | 6th Battalion, 31st Infantry Regiment search and destroy operations around FSB Seminole | Parrot's Beak region of Svay Rieng Province, Cambodia | 159 | 7 |
| May 8 – June 11 | Operation Concrete II | 7th Battalion, Royal Australian Regiment reconnaissance and ambush operation in Phước Tuy Province | | | |
| May 9 | Operation Cuu Long I | ARVN 9th Division, 21st Division, 5 Armored Cavalry Squadrons and Republic of Vietnam Marine Corps airborne, amphibious and mechanized operation to clear the banks of the Mekong River to allow access to a fleet of over 100 ships to evacuate 17,300 Vietnamese civilians from Phnom Penh and to clear the supply route from Phnom Penh to Kampong Cham | Mekong River | | |
| May 14 – 27 | Operation Binh Tay II | Phase II of the Cambodian Incursion. ARVN 40th and 47th Regiments 22nd Division were inserted by helicopter to attack PAVN Base Area 701 while the 3rd Armored Cavalry Regiment attacked across the border from Darlac Province into Ratanakiri Province | eastern Cambodia | | |
| May 14 – 28 | Operation Cheadle Blue | 2nd Battalion, 8th Infantry Regiment operation | Pleiku Province | | |
| May 15 – 25 | Operation Ashfield | 2nd Battalion, Royal Australian Regiment/RNZIR (ANZAC) reconnaissance and ambush operation | | | |
| May 15 - 25 | Operation Wayne Jump | 1st Brigade, 4th Infantry Division clear and search operation | Kon Tum Province | | |
| May 15 – 30 | Operation Barbara Glade I | Special Forces intelligence gathering operation | Khe Sanh plateau and Đa Krông river valley | | |
| May 15 – June 28 | Operation Bold Lancer II | 1st Brigade, 25th Infantry Division search and destroy operation | Cambodia | | |
| May 16 – 24 | Operation Cuu Long II | ARVN 9th Division, 21st Division, 4th Armored Brigade, 4th Ranger Group and Chau Doc Regional Forces and Popular Forces and FANK operation to clear PAVN forces | Takéo and along Route 2 and Route 3 | 613 | 36 |
| May 18 – 30 | Operation Fredenhall Gold | 4th Infantry Division security operation | Pleiku Province | | |
| May 18 – Oct 12 | Operation Putnam Paragon | 2nd Brigade, 4th Infantry Division clear and search operation | Bình Định Province | | |
| May 19 – Aug 15 73 | Operation Freedom Deal | Seventh Air Force interdiction and close air support campaign waged in Cambodia in support of the FANK against the NVA and Khmer Rouges | Cambodia | | |
| May 20 – June 27 | Operation Binh Tay III | Phase III of the Cambodian Incursion. ARVN 23rd Division attacked the PAVN 33rd Regiment in Base Area 740 west of Buôn Ma Thuột in Ratanakiri Province | eastern Cambodia | | |
| May 20 – June 29 | Operation Bryan White | 3rd Battalion, 506th Airborne Infantry and 2/1 Cavalry search and destroy operation | Đắk Lắk Province | | |
| May 25 – June 30 | Operation Cuu Long III | ARVN 9th Division, 4th Armored Brigade, 4th Ranger Group and Chau Doc Regional Forces and Popular Forces and FANK operation to clear PAVN forces | Route 2 and Route 3 Cambodia | | |
| May 26 – June 11 | Operation Capricorn | 2nd Battalion, Royal Australian Regiment/Royal New Zealand Infantry Regiment (ANZAC) battalion reconnaissance and ambush operation | Nui Dinh hills | 2 | 26 |
| June 1 – 9 | Operation Robertson White | 2nd Battalion, 8th Infantry Regiment security operation | | | |
| June 1 - 26 | Operation Wayne Hurdle | 1st Brigade, 4th Infantry Division clear and search operation | Bình Định, Phu Bon and Pleiku Provinces | | |
| June 12 – 28 | Operation Cung Chung I | 2nd Battalion, Royal Australian Regiment/Royal New Zealand Infantry Regiment (ANZAC), 7th Battalion, Royal Australian Regiment and 8th Battalion, Royal Australian Regiment reconnaissance-and-ambush mission to deny the VC access to villages along the main roads | Phước Tuy Province | | |
| June 16 – 30 | Operation Hancock Hawk | 3rd Battalion, 506th Airborne Infantry Regiment clear and search operation | Bình Thuận Province | | |
| June 19 – 23 | Operation Elanora | 7th Battalion, Royal Australian Regiment and B Squadron, 3rd Cavalry Regiment reconnaissance in force | Phước Tuy Province | | |
| June 23 – 27 | Operation Binh Tay IV | Phase IV of the Cambodian Incursion. ARVN 22nd Division movement of Cambodian refugees along Highway 19in eastern Cambodia to Đức Cơ District | eastern Cambodia | | |
| June 23 – 30 | Operation Barbara Glade II | Special Forces intelligence gathering operation | Khe Sanh plateau and Đa Krông river valley | | |
| June 23 - Jul 14 | Operation Wayne Fast | 1st Brigade, 4th Infantry Division clear and search operation | Bình Định Province | | |
| June 24 – 28 | Operation Wright Blue | 1st Battalion, 8th Infantry Regiment security operation | Pleiku Province | | |
| June 26 – Mar 1 71 | Operation Pennsylvania Square | 198th Infantry Brigade clear and search operation | Quảng Tín Province | | |
| June 29 – Jul 13 | Operation Petrie | 8th Battalion, Royal Australian Regiment reconnaissance and ambush operation | Phước Tuy Province | | |
| June 29 – Jul 23 | Operation Birdwood | 7th Battalion, Royal Australian Regiment operation to interdict VC movement to and from the Long Hải hills | Phước Tuy Province | | |
| Jul 1 – Oct 15 | Operation Keystone Robin (Alpha) | Redeployment of 3rd Brigade, 9th Infantry Division and 199th Infantry Brigade from South Vietnam to the United States | | | |
| Jul 2 – Sep 1 | Operation Brandeis Blue | 2nd Battalion, 8th Infantry, 4th Infantry Division search and destroy operation | Bình Định Province | | |
| Jul 5 – 21 | Operation Hancock Gold | 1st Battalion, 50th Infantry Regiment and 3rd Battalion, 506th Airborne Infantry Regiment clear and search operation | Bình Thuận Province | | |
| Jul 9 – 15 | Operation Clinch Valley | 3rd Brigade, 101st Airborne Division and ARVN 1st Division search and destroy operation | Khe Sanh plateau, Quảng Trị Province | | |
| Jul 12 – Aug 26 | Operation Elk Canyon I | 196th Infantry Brigade search and clear operation | near Kham Duc, Quảng Trị Province | | |
| Jul 13 – Aug 2 | Operation Nathan | 2nd Battalion, Royal Australian Regiment/Royal New Zealand Infantry Regiment and 107th Field Battery series of reconnaissance and ambush and land clearing protection missions | centre and south-west Phước Tuy Province | | |
| Jul 15 – Aug 24 | Operation Pickens Forest | 1st Battalion, 7th Marines and 2nd Battalion, 7th Marines clear and search operation | near Song Thu Bon valley, Quảng Nam Province | 99 | 4 |
| Jul 16 - 27 | Operation Wayne Span I | 1st Brigade, 4th Infantry Division clear and search operation | Bình Định Province | | |
| Jul 22 - Jan 30 1971 | Operation Wolfe Mountain | 1st Brigade, 5th Infantry Division operation in Quảng Trị Province | 300 | | |
| Jul 23 – Aug 2 | Operation Decade | 8th Battalion, Royal Australian Regiment village security operation in Phước Tuy Province | | | |
| Jul 24 – 26 | Operation Clemens Green | 4th Infantry Division security operation | Pleiku and Đắk Lắk Provinces | | |
| Jul 24 – 27 | Operation Barren Green | 5th Marines operation | Mỹ Hiệp, An Giang Province | | |
| Jul 24 – Aug 11 | Operation Chicago Peak | 1st Brigade, 101st Airborne Division and ARVN 3rd Regiment, 1st Division operation | A Shau Valley | 97 | 3 |
| Jul 27 – Aug 24 | Operation Lyon Valley | 5th Marines clear and search operation | southwest of Da Nang | 5 | |
| Jul 28 - Aug 5 | Operation Wayne Span II | 1st Brigade, 4th Infantry Division clear and search operation | Bình Định Province | | |
| Jul 28 – Aug 16 | Operation Greene Jack (1970) | 3rd Battalion, 506th Airborne Infantry Regiment operation | Bình Định Province | | |
| Aug – Feb 71 | Operation Chenla I | FANK operation with limited ARVN and RVNAF support against PAVN and VC to reopen Route 7 between Skuon and Kompong Cham | Route 7 | | |
| Aug 3 – Sep 10 | Operation Cung Chung II | 1st Squadron SAS and 8th Battalion, Royal Australian Regiment operation to ambush VC supply routes | Hoa Long | 9 | |
| Aug 5 - 27 | Operation Wayne Pierce | 1st Brigade, 4th Infantry Division clear and search operation | Bình Định Province | | |
| Aug 13 – 20 | Operation Comeback Ridge | 3rd Brigade, 101st Airborne Division operation | Thừa Thiên Province | | |
| Aug 13 – 30 | Operation Ripley Center | 1st Battalion, 5th Marines, 1st Battalion, 7th Marines, 2nd Battalion, 7th Marines and 3rd Battalion, 7th Marines clear and search operation | Quảng Nam Province | | |
| Aug 27 – Sep 29 | Operation Elk Canyon II | 196th Infantry Brigade search and clear operation | near Kham Duc, Quảng Trị Province | | |
| Aug 28 - Oct 14 | Operation Wayne Forge | 1st Brigade, 4th Infantry Division clear and search operation | Bình Định Province | | |
| Aug 29 – Sep 20 | Operation Massey-Harris | Whisky Coy RNZIR, 1 ATF HQ D&E Platoon, 3rd Cavalry Regiment, and A Squadron 1st Armoured Regiment rice denial operation | Phước Tuy Province | | |
| Aug 31 – May 12 71 | Operation Imperial Lake | 1st Battalion 5th Marines, 2nd Battalion 5th Marines and 3rd Battalion 5th Marines search and clear operation | Quảng Nam Province | 305 | |
| Sep 5 – 8 | Operation Nebraska Rapids | 196th Infantry Brigade, 1st Marine Division and ARVN 2nd Division operation | Quảng Ngãi Province | | |
| Sep 5 – Oct 6 71 | Operation Jefferson Glenn | 101st Airborne Division, 1st Brigade, 5th Infantry Division and ARVN 1st Division operation. This was the last major offensive operation involving US ground troops | Thừa Thiên and Quảng Trị Provinces. | 2,026 | 60 |
| Sep 10 – 19 | Operation Ballard Valley | 1st Marine Division search and destroy operation | near Da Nang | | |
| Sep 10 – 19 | Operation Dubois Square | 1st Marine Division operation | near Da Nang | | |
| Sep 10 – Oct 25 | Operation Cung Chung 3 | 1st Squadron SAS and 8th Battalion, Royal Australian Regiment operation to ambush a VC party | Hoa Long | | |
| Sep 11 - 13 | Operation Tailwind | MACV-SOG operation | Laos | 54 | 3 |
| Sep 18 – 21 | Operation Catawba Falls | 1st Marine Division operation in Quảng Nam Province to cover the movement of the 5th Marines from An Hoa to the Vu Gia River Valley | Quảng Nam Province | | |
| Sep 25 – Oct 12 | Operation Murray Blue | 2nd Battalion, 8th Infantry Regiment operation | Bình Định Province | | |
| Sep 26 - Oct 10 | Operation Tiger Mountain | 2nd Brigade, 4th Infantry Division operation | | | |
| Oct 1 – 2 | Operation Pimlico | 2nd Battalion, Royal Australian Regiment/Royal New Zealand Infantry Regiment (ANZAC) operation with support of 107th Field Battery, a search-and-ambush mission carried out in cooperation with the Royal Thai Army Volunteer Regiment | | | |
| Oct 1 – Feb 1 71 | Operation Cung Chung III | 2nd Battalion, Royal Australian Regiment/Royal New Zealand Infantry Regiment (ANZAC) and 7th Battalion, Royal Australian Regiment reconnaissance in force | Phước Tuy Province | | |
| Oct 2 - 15 | Operation Tolare Falls I | 5th Marines clear and search operation | Quảng Nam Province | 30 | |
| Oct 4 - Nov 17 | Operation Wayne Sabre | 1st Brigade, 4th Infantry Division clear and search operation | Bình Định Province | | |
| Oct 12 – 24 | Operation Putnam Valley | 1st Battalion, 12th Infantry Regiment operation | Bình Định Province | | |
| Oct 16 – Dec 31 | Operation Keystone Robin (Bravo) | Redeployment of the 4th Infantry Division and 25th Infantry Division (excl 2nd Brigade) from South Vietnam to the United States | | | |
| Oct 22 – Nov 3 | Operation Noble Canyon | 5th Marines clear and search operation | Quảng Nam Province | | |
| Oct 23 - Nov 10 | Operation Toan Thang 8/B/5 | ARVN 5th Division operations for the purpose of destroying communist forces and installations, and obtaining intelligence | Snoul, Cambodia | | |
| Oct 27 | Operation Tolare Falls II | 5th Marines clear and search operation | Quảng Nam Province | 22 | 4 |
| Nov 18 | Operation Hancock Dragon | 1st Squadron, 10th Cavalry Regiment and 2nd Battalion, 503rd Airborne Infantry Regiment security operation | Pleiku Province | | |
| Nov 21 | Operation Ivory Coast | Attempted rescue of POWs at Son Tay POW camp, North Vietnam | 50 (est) | | |
| Dec 2 – 24 | Operation Darby Swing | 2nd Battalion, 503rd Airborne Infantry security operation later merged into Operation Hancock Dragon | Bình Định Province | | |
| Dec 17 – Jan 19 71 | Operation Hoang Dieu 101 | III MAF, ROK 2nd Marine Brigade and ARVN 51st Regiment operation | Quảng Nam Province | 538 | |

== See also ==
- List of allied military operations of the Vietnam War (1971)
