= Sihanouk Trail =

Military supply route in Cambodia

- Cambodia
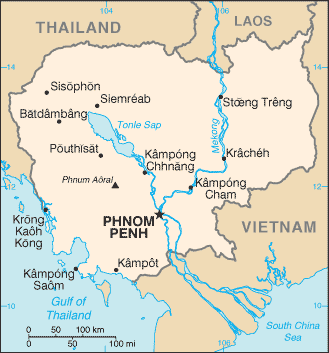
- Cambodia

Site information
- Type: Logistical route
- Controlled by: People's Army of Vietnam

Site history
- Built: 1965–1966
- In use: 1966–1975
- Battles/wars: Operation Menu; Cambodian Incursion; Operation Patio; Operation Freedom Deal

Garrison information
- Garrison: 3,000–10,000

The Sihanouk Trail was a logistical supply system in Cambodia used by the People's Army of Vietnam (PAVN) and its Viet Cong (VC) guerrillas during the Vietnam War (1960–1975). Between 1966 and 1970, this system operated in the same manner and served the same purposes as the much better known Ho Chi Minh trail (the Truong Son Road to the North Vietnamese) which ran through the southeastern portion of the Kingdom of Laos. The name is of American derivation. The North Vietnamese considered the system an integral supply route. Widespread U.S. attempts to interdict this system began in 1969.

== Sihanoukville connection (1966–1968) ==
Prince Norodom Sihanouk had ruled Cambodia since he had wrested independence from the French on 9 November 1953. He had accomplished this task by political maneuvering between both the left and the right to achieve what no other ruler or political group in Indochina had managed, a relatively bloodless transition to independence. During the next ten years, while the conflicts in neighboring Laos and South Vietnam heated up, Sihanouk managed to sustain his delicate domestic political balance while at the same time maintaining his nation's neutrality (guaranteed by the 1954 Geneva Conference that ended the First Indochina War).

This was no small accomplishment considering that Cambodia was wedged between its perennial enemies: Thailand to the west and South Vietnam to the east, both of whom were increasingly supported by the United States.

Sihanouk came to believe that communist triumph in Southeast Asia was inevitable and that Cambodia's military was incapable of defeating the North Vietnamese, even with U.S. support. If Cambodia (and his rule) was to survive, he would have to make a bargain with the devil. On 10 April 1965 he broke off diplomatic relations with the U.S. and swung politically to the left. This move was not without reason. To gain foreign support, both economic and political, Sihanouk turned to the People's Republic of China. One of the terms of the agreement between Sihanouk and Premier Zhou Enlai was that Cambodia would allow the use of its eastern border by the North Vietnamese in their effort to reunify the two Vietnams.

In the earliest days of the Vietnam War, North Vietnam supplied the VC in the South by two methods. The first was to extend the Ho Chi Minh Trail southward into the tri-border region of Laos/Cambodia/South Vietnam. The Trail, a labyrinth of paths, roads, river transportation systems and way-stations, was constantly being expanded and improved. It served as a logistical jugular vein, for both men and material, for the North Vietnamese war effort against South Vietnam. The second method was to transport supplies by sea. Estimates of this seaborne traffic ran as high as 70 percent. It was carried out due to the higher volume of material that could be transported by sea, as opposed to the overland route.

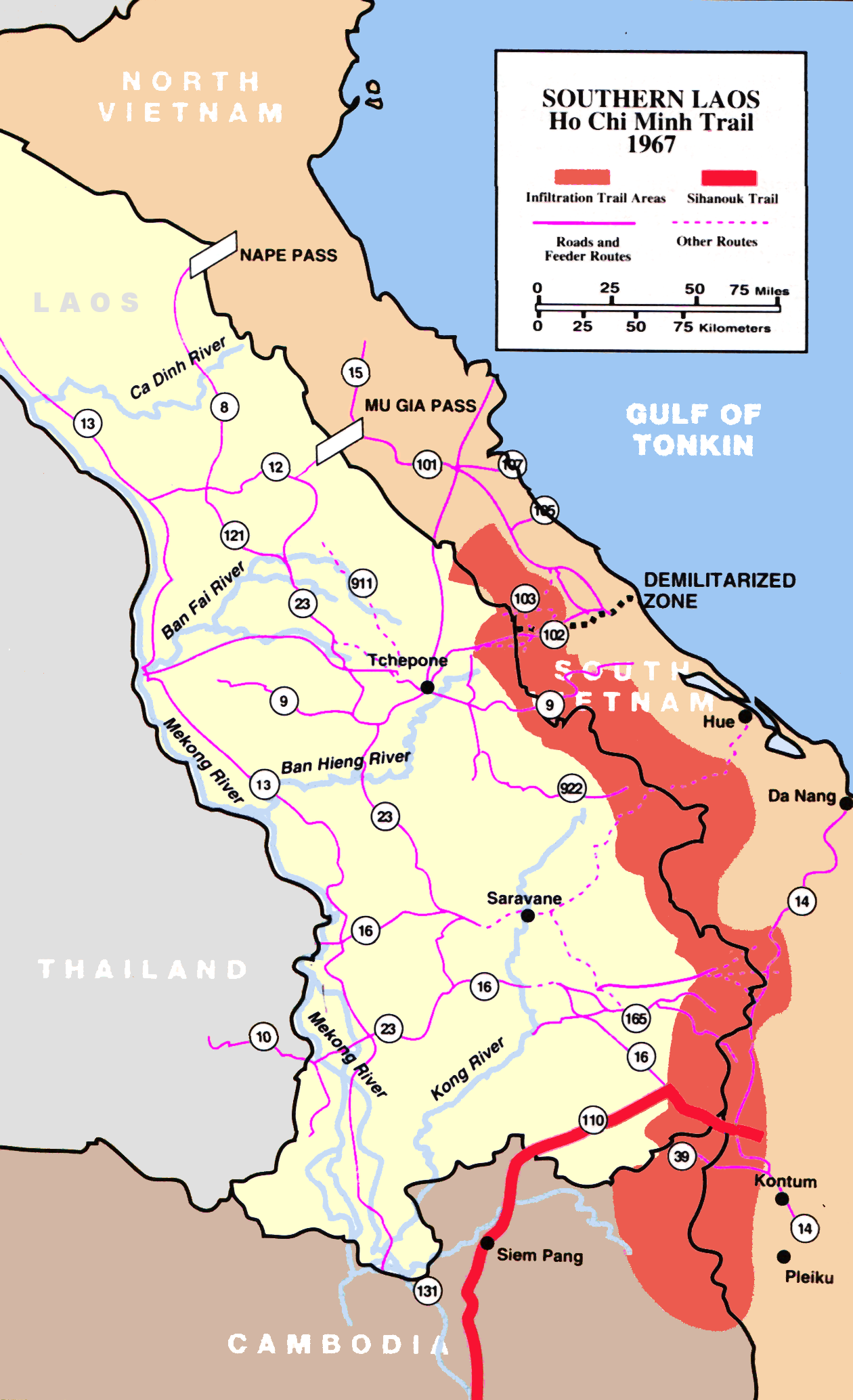
The Ho Chi Minh trail

After direct American intervention in 1965, the increased presence of U.S. naval vessels in coastal waters under Operation Market Time nullified the seaborne route into South Vietnam. Following on the agreement between Sihanouk and the Chinese, an arrangement was also struck between the prince and the North Vietnamese government. In October military supplies were shipped directly from North Vietnam on communist-flagged (especially of the Eastern bloc) ships to the Cambodian port of Sihanoukville, where Cambodia's neutrality guaranteed their delivery.

The supplies were unloaded and then transferred to trucks which transported them to the frontier zones that served as PAVN/VC base areas. These base areas also served as sanctuaries for PAVN/VC troops, who simply crossed the border from South Vietnam and then rested, reinforced, and refitted for their next campaign in safety. None of this could have been accomplished without the acquiescence of Sihanouk.

During 1965 the PAVN had already begun construction of new supply routes to connect the segments of the Ho Chi Minh Trail that ran through southern Laos and into Cambodia. The following year, U.S. intelligence discovered that a new road (Route 110), coming up from Cambodia, was now linked to those in Laos. The discovery of Route 110 was the origin of the term "Sihanouk Trail", but it quickly came to encompass the entire Cambodian logistical system. The new PAVN overland logistical effort, and its seaborne corollary was now directed by PAVN Unit K-20, located in the Cambodian capital of Phnom Penh. K-20 worked under the guise of a commercial company owned by local ethnic Vietnamese.

Although the U.S. command in Saigon and the politicians in Washington became increasingly aware of this arrangement during 1966–1967, they declined to overtly interfere due to the political ramifications of conducting military operations against a neutral country and the wishes of Sihanouk. Washington still had hopes of reopening a dialog with Sihanouk and refrained from any actions that might alienate him further.

Covert operations, however, were another matter. One result of the increasing PAVN road building effort in Cambodia was that the U.S. also upped the ante against the trail system in Laos by launching the first B-52 Stratofortress strike against the logistical system on 12 December 1965. In April 1967 the U.S. headquarters in Saigon finally received authorization to launch Daniel Boone, an intelligence gathering operation conducted by the secretive Military Assistance Command, Vietnam Studies and Observations Group or SOG.

The reconnaissance teams that "hopped the fence" into Cambodia were under strict orders not to engage in combat and to covertly collect intelligence on the base areas and PAVN activities. The result of this effort was Project Vesuvius, in which the American command collated the gathered intelligence on PAVN/VC violations of Cambodian neutrality and presented it to Sihanouk in hopes of altering his position.

Even in 1968 there were disputes within the American government as to the scope and scale of the Cambodian logistical effort. There were also disputes as regards the involvement of Cambodians or the Cambodian government in the logistical effort.

== Operation Menu (1969–1970) ==
With the election of President Richard M. Nixon in 1968 and the announcement of the new American policy of Vietnamization in 1969, America's relations with Cambodia began to change. The goal of the U.S. was now to buy time for their South Vietnamese allies and to cover their own withdrawal. On 11 May 1969 Sihanouk welcomed a return to full diplomatic relations with the U.S. On 18 March Nixon, already anticipating this development, ordered the bombing of the Cambodian sanctuaries by B-52s. On that date 48 bombers, under secret orders from the president, crossed into Cambodian airspace and delivered their payloads in Operation Breakfast.

During the next 14 months this operation was followed by Lunch, Snack, Dinner, Dessert, and Supper as American bombers flew 3,630 sorties and expended 100,000 tons of ordnance on the Base Areas in what came to be called Operation Menu. During this time frame, the entire program was held as a closely guarded secret from Congress, the American people, and amazingly, from the Air Force itself.

Sihanouk was surprisingly acquiescent about the whole affair. He was under pressure from the U.S. to reopen diplomatic ties and to act militarily against the sanctuaries; from the North Vietnamese, who now received 80 percent of their supplies for their southernmost operations through Sihanoukville; and from the fledgling Chinese-supported Khmer Rouge (approximately 4,000 men). Sihanouk felt that this was a propitious moment to swing back to the right. By the summer he created a right-wing Government of National Salvation under General Lon Nol and he suspended North Vietnamese arms shipments through his ports.

It was however, too late. By December, the political balancing act that the prince had conducted for two decades, collapsed around him. In March 1970 Sihanouk lost control of the government. Contrary to expectations, the American bombing effort had not pulverized the base areas and had only tended to drive PAVN/VC deeper into the Cambodian countryside. This series of events began to pose questions for Hanoi. The North Vietnamese had been willing to maintain the status quo in Cambodia as long as their supply lines and sanctuaries were secure. But with the expansion of the war across the border they might have to take further steps to maintain their position.

== Coup and incursion (1970) ==
On 18 March 1970, taking advantage of a visit by Sihanouk to Moscow and Beijing, the prince was deposed by the National Assembly, who promptly announced the creation of the Khmer Republic. The real power, however, fell into the hands of Lon Nol. Lon Nol promptly issued an ultimatum to the North Vietnamese, ordering them out of the country, but the only real result was that the Khmer National Army (ANK) led a bloody pogrom against ethnic Vietnamese in the eastern provinces.

Sihanouk, furious with the course of events, quickly assumed leadership, in absentia, of the National United Front of Kampuchea (FUNK), a government in exile that was quickly recognized and supported by the North Vietnamese, the VC, the Lao Pathet Lao and the Khmer Rouge. In the wake of the removal of Sihanouk, the Lon Nol government turned over captured documents to the U.S. disclosing the full extent of his participation in the infiltration effort. Between December 1966 and April 1969, Unit K-20 had facilitated the infiltration of 29,000 tons of cargo into Cambodia. With his acquiescence, the unit had purchased 55,000 tons of rice annually from the government and another 100,000 tons directly from Cambodian farmers.

Under Lon Nol (and with American assistance), the ANK was enlarged and reorganized into the Forces Armees Nationales Khmeres (FANK) and then launched into offensives against PAVN. Hanoi responded by launching Campaign X, an operation to widen the buffer zones around its lines of communication. John Shaw, in his The Cambodian Campaign refers to Campaign X only in the context of military actions in South Vietnam. It is symptomatic of many American sources (as it was to the American leadership at the time) that Cambodia was only relevant insofar as it affected the conflict in South Vietnam.

Using economy of force, as few as 10,000 PAVN troops routed FANK forces in western and northeastern Cambodia, taking or threatening 16 of Cambodia's 19 provincial capitals and interdicting, for various periods, all road and rail links to the capital.

Nixon was more than willing to seize the advantage offered by the ousting of Sihanouk and the opportunity to strike the border sanctuaries as a means of buying time for both the U.S. and South Vietnam. On 29 April, the first bombings of Operation Patio took place. Like Menu, these tactical airstrikes were held in close secrecy. Although they were initially an anti-infiltration measure, they quickly expanded as targets deeper in Cambodia became the norm. The program was quickly superseded by Operation Freedom Deal, the overt support of FANK forces by B-52 and tactical airstrikes by American and South Vietnamese aircraft.

On 29 April a South Vietnamese armored task force crossed the Cambodian border into the area known as the Parrot's Beak, northwest of Saigon. The following day a multi-division U.S./South Vietnamese force rolled over the border and into the area known as the Fishhook, north of Saigon and opposite Bình Long Province. With the exception of heavy fighting at Snuol, PAVN/VC resistance was light since most of the North Vietnamese had been withdrawn from the border regions for operations against FANK.

Washington and the American command in Saigon considered the operation a great success, both as a test of the new American policy of Vietnamization and in setting back any PAVN/VC offensives planned against the Saigon area during the next year. The logistical haul overrun and captured by the allied forces in the base areas was indeed impressive. 20,000 individual and 2,500 crew-served weapons; 7,000 tons of rice; 1,800 tons of munitions; 140,000 rockets and artillery shells; 435 vehicles; 29 tons of communications equipment; 55 tons of medical supplies; and 199,552 anti-aircraft rounds. The incursion was, however, limited in its scale and scope. Nixon had limited the depth of penetration by U.S. forces to 35 kilometers and placed a 30 June deadline for the withdrawal of American troops to South Vietnam.

Many observers were more circumspect. As early as October 1969 (and possibly anticipating the loss of their Cambodian routes) PAVN had begun what was "probably their largest and most intense logistical effort of the whole war" by constructing and expanding their routes into northwestern Cambodia. The CIA estimated that the replacement of the supplies lost during the incursion would only take 75 days to achieve. As far as the long-term repercussions, there were three, all detrimental to the American cause: increased antiwar sentiment in the U.S., which would eventually lead to the fall of South Vietnam in 1975; the beginning of outright support of the Khmer Rouge by the North Vietnamese (who despised and distrusted their Chinese-supported comrades); and the spreading of general war throughout Southeast Asia.

== (1971–1975) ==
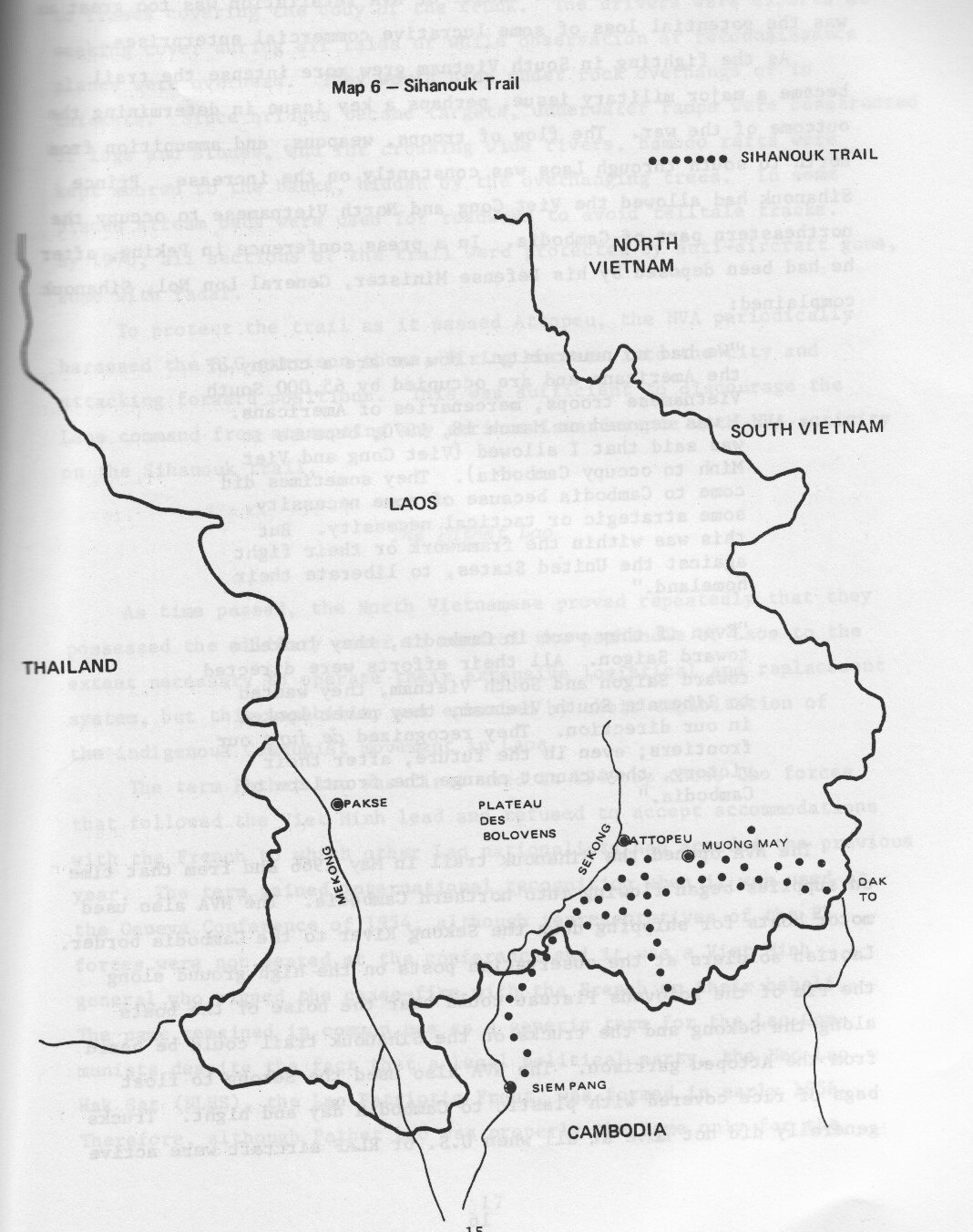
Sihanouk Trail Connections in the Laotian Panhandle

As had occurred at the end of the 1968 Tet Offensive, the North Vietnamese logistical network was improved and expanded in the wake of the incursion. Due to the loss of its Cambodian port access, Hanoi established the 470th Transportation Group to control and coordinate its Cambodian supply operations.

The new route turned west from Muong May, at the southern end of Laos, and paralleled the Kong River into Cambodia. Eventually, this network extended past Siem Prang and reached the Mekong River near Stung Treng. The next step was the seizure of the town of Kratié, in east-central Cambodia, on 5 May. The 470th cleared the population out of the Mekong River town and turned it into its administrative headquarters. PAVN base areas to the east were fed by Kratié while men and supplies headed for the Mekong Delta region of South Vietnam were now circled westward, around Phnom Penh, through the foothills of the Cardamom Mountains and then east again to cross the border.

On 20 August 1971, Lon Nol (now president) launched Operation Chenla II in an effort to open communications between Phnom Penh and the nation's second largest city, Kompong Thom. The two cities had been isolated from another for more than a year by the Khmer Rouge. FANK was initially successful, but the Khmer Rouge backed by the PAVN launched a counteroffensive and annihilated the government forces.

By 1972 FANK was decimated, the road and rail networks were smashed, and inflation was rampant. The rice harvest plunged from 3.8 million tons in 1969 to 493,000 tons in 1973. Popular support for the war against the North Vietnamese and the insurgents had completely evaporated. The Americans, negotiating with the North Vietnamese, had proposed an Indochina-wide cease fire as part of the final settlement of the conflict in South Vietnam.

On 28 January 1973, the day the Paris Peace Accords took effect, Lon Nol announced a unilateral cease-fire, which the Khmer Rouge promptly ignored, claiming that it was "a deception engineered by the U.S. imperialists and their allies." In April, Phnom Penh itself was saved from capture only by a massive bombing effort conducted by U.S. aircraft.

This was the end of U.S. air support, the last American aircraft departing Cambodian airspace on 15 August. From the beginning of Operation Breakfast the U.S. Air Force had dropped 539,129 tons of ordnance on Cambodia, 257,465 tons of which had been dropped during the last six months of the operation. During 1974, Cambodia continued to collapse. More than half of the population had become refugees and malnutrition and disease stalked a nation that had once been the best fed in Southeast Asia.

On New Year's Day 1975 the Khmer Rouge launched their final offensive against the Khmer Republic. Neither the agony of the Cambodian people nor the resignation of Lon Nol could halt or slow the Khmer Rouge advance. By 17 April, Phnom Penh had fallen.

== Sources ==
=== Unpublished government documents ===
- U.S. Military Assistance Command, Vietnam Command History 1967, Appendix E. Saigon, 1968.
- U.S. Military Assistance Command, Vietnam Command History 1968, Appendix F. Saigon, 1969.

=== Published government documents ===
- MACV, The Joint Command in the Years of Escalation, 1962–1967

=== Secondary sources ===
- Kissinger, Henry A., White House Years
- Morris, Virginia and Hills, Clive, Ho Chi Minh's Blueprint for Revolution: In the Words of Vietnamese Strategists and Operatives, McFarland & Co Inc, 2018.
- Morris, Virginia and Hills, Clive, A History of the Ho Chi Minh Trail: The Road to Freedom, Orchid Press, 2006.
