= Operation Toan Thang =

Operation Toan Thang may refer to:

- Operation Toan Thang I, a U.S. Army, Army of the Republic of Vietnam (ARVN), 1st Australian Task Force and Royal Thai Volunteer Regiment operation during the Vietnam War in III Corps conducted from 8 April to 31 May 1968
- Operation Toan Thang II, allied operation in III Corps from 1 June 1968 to 16 February 1969
- Operation Toan Thang III, allied operation in III Corps from 17 February and 31 October 1969
- Campaign Toan Thang, a People's Army of Vietnam wet season offensive of the Laotian Civil War from 18 to 27 June 1969
- Operation Toan Thang IV, allied operation in III Corps from 1 November 1969 to 1 May 1970
- Operation Toan Thang 41, an ARVN operation during the Cambodian Campaign in the Angel's Wing area from 14 to 17 April 1970
- Operation Toan Thang 42, an ARVN operation during the Cambodian Campaign in the Parrot's Beak area from 30 April to 29 June 1970
- Operation Toan Thang 43-6, an ARVN operation during the Cambodian Campaign in the Fishhook area from 1 May to 30 June 1970
- Operation Toan Thang 44, U.S. 1st Brigade, 25th Infantry Division operation during the Cambodian Campaign from 6 to 14 May 1970
- Operation Toan Thang 45, U.S. 1st Cavalry Division operation during the Cambodian Campaign from 6 May to 30 June 1970
- Operation Toan Thang 46, an ARVN operation during the Cambodian Campaign from 6 May to 30 June 1970
