= Jerry Shriver =

American soldier (1941–1969)

Jerry Michael Shriver
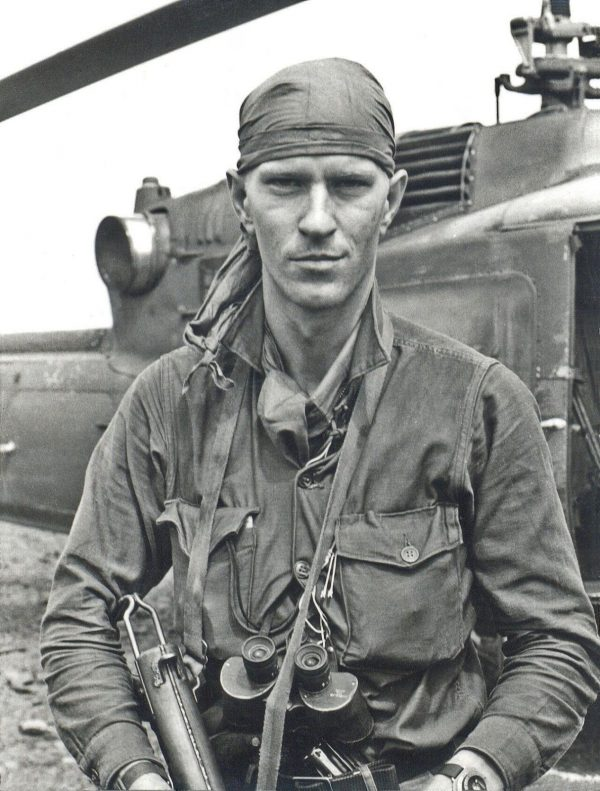
- Born: 24 September 1941; DeFuniak Springs, Florida, U.S.
- Disappeared: 24 April 1969; Memot, Cambodia
- Died: 10 June 1974 'Presumptive Finding of Death'
- Military career
- Allegiance: United States
- Branch: United States Army
- Service years: 1962–1969
- Rank: Master sergeant
- Nicknames: Mad Dog, Digger
- Units: MACV-SOG; 5th Special Forces Group
- Conflicts: Vietnam War
- Awards: Silver Star (2); Soldier's Medal; Bronze Star Medal (7); Purple Heart; Army Commendation Medal (3); Air Medal

Jerry Michael Tate Shriver (24 September 1941 – 10 June 1974), also known by his nickname "Mad Dog", was a Master Sergeant in the United States Army who served in MACV-SOG in the Vietnam War. He took part in operations along the Ho Chi Minh Trail, Cambodia, and Laos from 1966 to 1969. He also served in West Germany as part of a long-range patrol unit and in Taiwan. He participated in classified special operations missions in South Vietnam, Cambodia, and Laos, leading Montagnard soldiers and conducting reconnaissance tasks.

== Early life ==
Jerry Michael Tate Shriver was born to Dale Leroy Shriver and Dorothy Madelyn Shriver on 24 September 1941 in DeFuniak Springs, Florida. He had three sisters and two brothers. His family moved to Sacramento, California, while he was still in school.

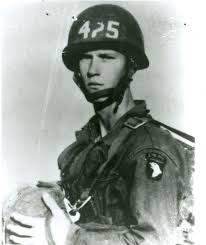
Shriver while serving in the 101st Airborne Division. circa 1963.

== Military career ==
=== 1962–1966 ===
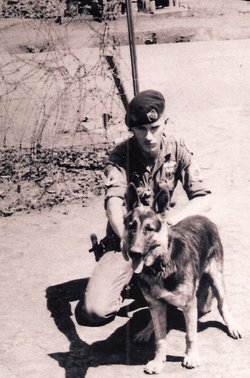
Shriver with his German Shepherd "Klaus".

In 1962, at the age of 21, Shriver enlisted in the United States Army. After finishing basic training, he attended the United States Army Airborne School. After briefly serving in the 101st Airborne Division, he joined the 7th Army's Long Range Patrol Company and was sent to West Germany to serve near the border with East Germany. He was also deployed in Taiwan and Vietnam in 1964 and 1966, respectively, as part of the 5th Special Forces Group.

=== First and second tours in Vietnam (1966–1967) ===
Shriver initially served with Project Omega (Detachment B-50), a Special Forces reconnaissance unit created to provide I Field Force, Vietnam with a long-range patrol capability similar to Project DELTA. Although transferred to MACV-SOG in November 1967, Project Omega was originally independent of that organization. By then, Shriver had become a team leader (1-0 in SOG) commanding Recon Team (RT) Brace. On one occasion, his platoon was surrounded by the Viet Cong. In a now-famous radio transmission to his base, he coolly remarked, “No, no… I’ve got ’em right where I want ’em—surrounded from the inside.” He was also known for favoring short-barreled shotguns and submachine guns while refusing to carry long rifles such as the M16.

On October 8, 1966, while operating in the jungle, Shriver heard two nearby rifle shots and immediately alerted a supporting aircraft and his team’s base, warning that the mission might be compromised. Discovering a trail intersection, he posted two men to guard it while leading the rest of his team down an alternate path. Shortly afterward, the security team spotted a Viet Cong unit following them and opened fire, wounding one enemy fighter and driving the others away. Shriver quickly pursued the injured soldier, leading his men back into the forest. When he spotted the wounded combatant attempting to escape, Shriver made a full 360-degree turn and seized him without firing a shot. He then maneuvered his team toward a landing zone, but two sizable enemy groups advanced from opposite directions. Although the prisoner initially escaped, Shriver chased him down once more, ultimately stopping him with a precise gunshot. Attack helicopters soon arrived, driving off the remaining Viet Cong.

On October 23, 1967, Shriver led a reconnaissance team across the border into Cambodia and into the Fishhook region, where they discovered an abandoned company-sized bivouac camp. The camp had been hastily relocated deeper into the country, forcing the team to push farther than planned. Four armed helicopter missions were flown to assist with their exfiltration, though the outcomes of these missions remain unclear. That afternoon, while commanding a reconnaissance operation deep inside enemy territory, Shriver distinguished himself with exceptional bravery. After the team was resupplied, a small hostile force spotted them. Hoping to capture a prisoner, Shriver attempted to lure the enemy closer. Another NVA soldier approached from a different direction and identified the group as a reconnaissance team. Shriver opened fire, triggering a firefight as enemy forces—now numbering roughly a platoon—moved in. To avoid revealing their precise location, Shriver ordered his men to throw hand grenades rather than engage in sustained gunfire. Soon, the team found itself backed against a large lake and surrounded on three sides. Informing the Forward Air Controllers of their perilous situation, Shriver reported that an enemy platoon was closing in and shouting that the rest of their company would soon arrive. Two USAF gunships were dispatched, and under Shriver’s direction, they unleashed rockets and minigun fire on NVA soldiers positioned barely thirty meters away. Throughout the intense battle, Shriver calmly adjusted the supporting fire to within twenty meters of his team until the enemy finally retreated.

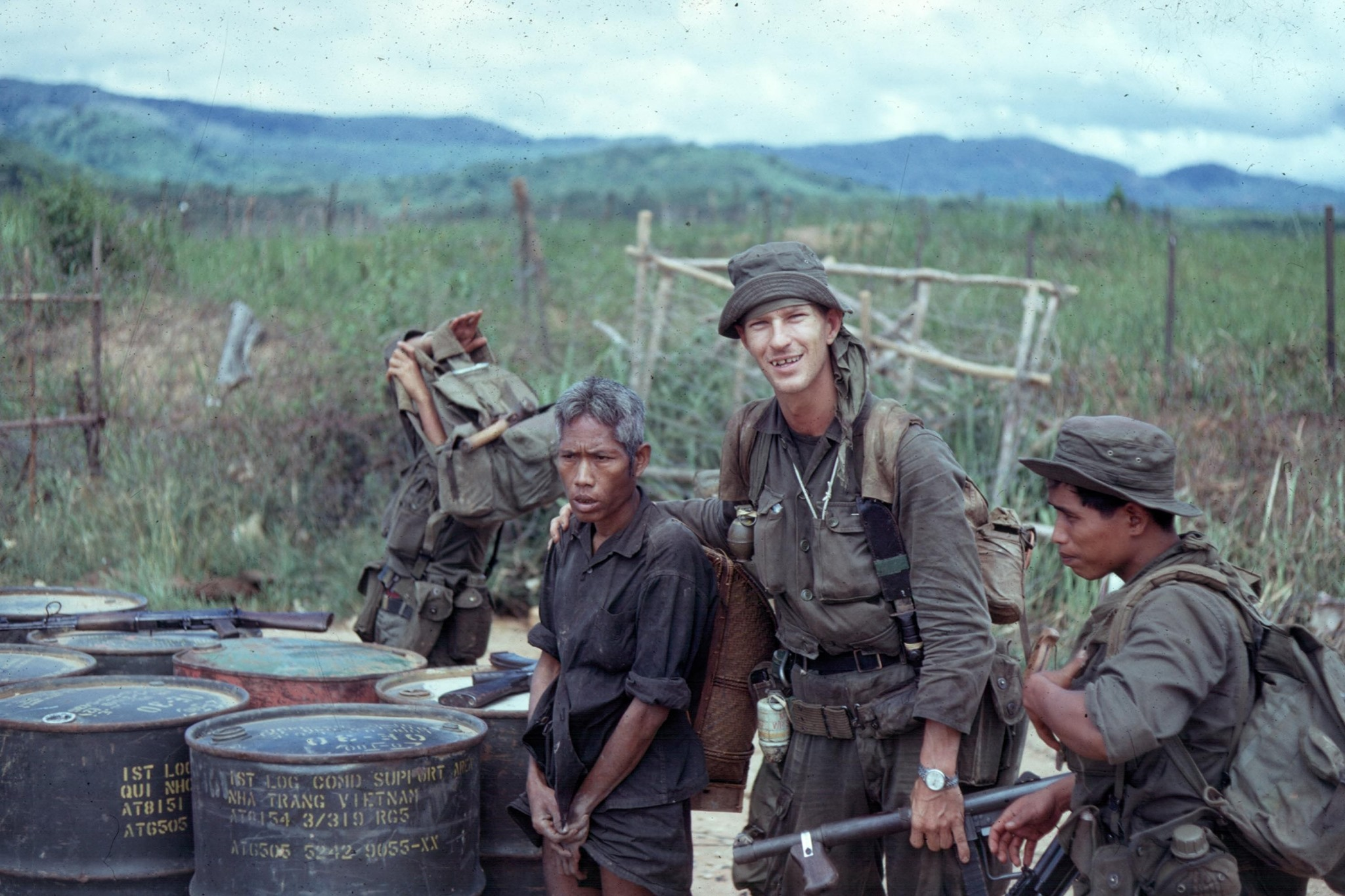
Shriver with Montagnard soldiers, circa 1968.

Throughout 1967, Shriver and his unit remained active, frequently conducting reconnaissance missions in Cambodia’s Fishhook region. On several occasions, they narrowly escaped encirclement by NVA forces, aided by Shriver’s tactical expertise. On May 13, 1967, during a reconnaissance and ambush patrol as part of Omega Recon and Reaction Patrol Team “Stud”, Shriver was wounded but assumed command of the patrol, exposing himself to enemy fire while organizing a defensive perimeter. His actions resulted in twelve enemy casualties with minimal losses to his team. His reputation grew to the point that Radio Hanoi mentioned him in propaganda broadcasts, providing battle details and even announcing a $10,000 bounty on his head (equivalent to approximately $85,000 today). By the end of 1967, reports credited him with a kill count exceeding one hundred enemy soldiers.

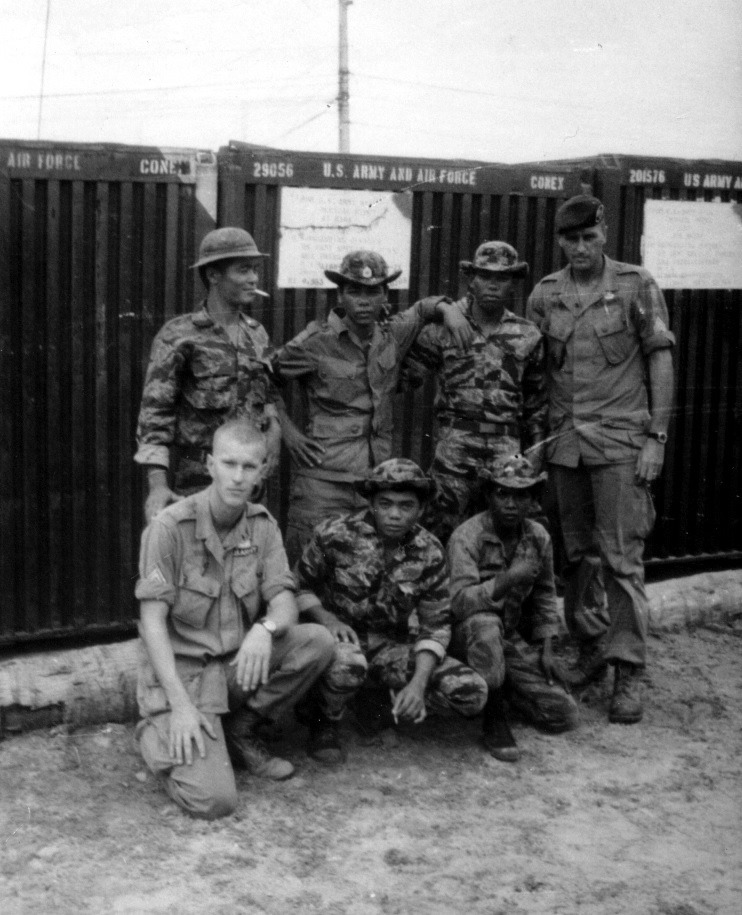
MACV-SOG recon team. Shriver at lower left. 1968.

=== Third tour (1968–1969) ===
Shriver remained in Vietnam for most of 1968. From January to May, he continued conducting operations before taking a mandatory summer leave in the United States, where he spent time with fellow Green Beret Larry White. During this leave, Shriver purchased weapons, including a lever-action rifle chambered for the .444 Marlin cartridge, and mailed them back to his base for future use.

After returning to Vietnam, Shriver participated in a mission on November 4, 1968. When his reconnaissance team landed on a remote strip, they encountered an enemy force estimated to be the size of a battalion. Leading a squad of three soldiers, Shriver initiated a fierce attack that killed four and wounded twenty-six enemy combatants. He directed gunship fire while simultaneously providing cover for his radio operator and coordinating with the aircraft. As a Bell UH-1 Iroquois helicopter arrived to extract the team, it came under heavy machine-gun fire. Shriver guided his men to an alternate landing zone, calling in additional gunship strikes during the movement. Rope ladders were dropped for extraction, and as the last man aboard, Shriver attached himself to a ladder with a snap link and continued firing at the enemy while hanging from the helicopter until it cleared the danger zone.

==== Disappearance and presumed death ====
On April 24, 1969, Shriver and a team of U.S. and Montagnard troops were inserted by helicopter into Kampong Cham Province, Cambodia, and immediately came under heavy fire near their initial rallying point. During the firefight, Shriver was last seen moving toward a tree line before radio contact was lost. The team was forced to evacuate without him. He was declared missing in action and later promoted in absentia to the rank of master sergeant. Despite subsequent search efforts, no trace of Shriver was found, and the U.S. Army issued a presumptive finding of his death in 1974. His remains have not been recovered as of April, 2026.

== Medals and decorations ==
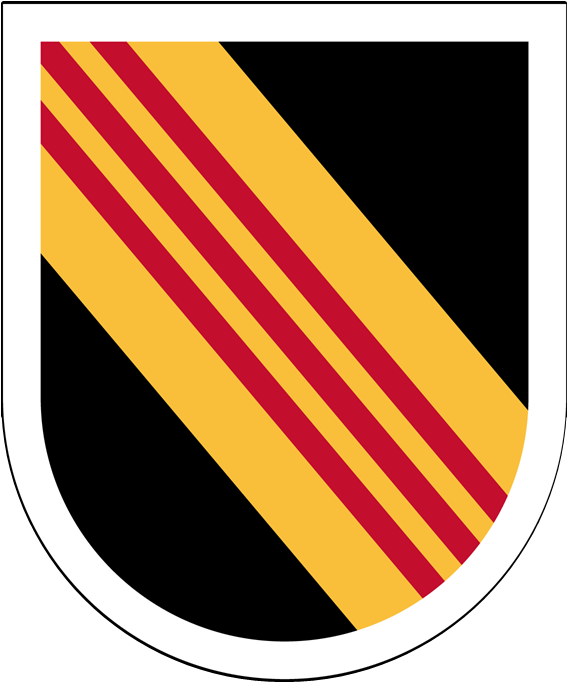
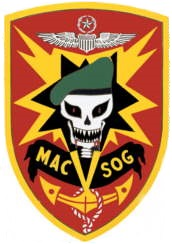

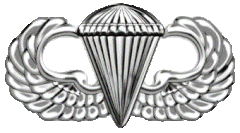

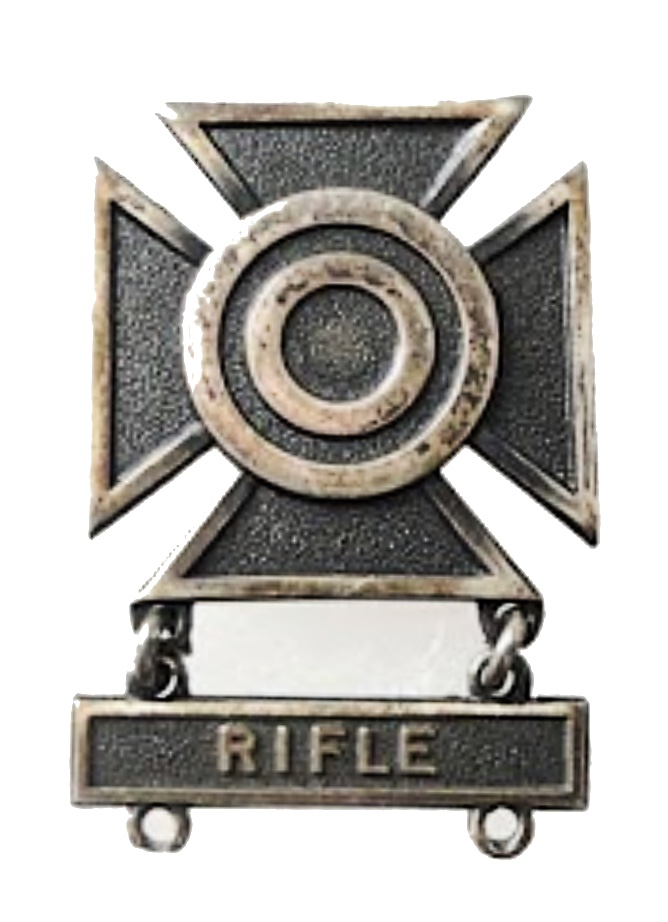
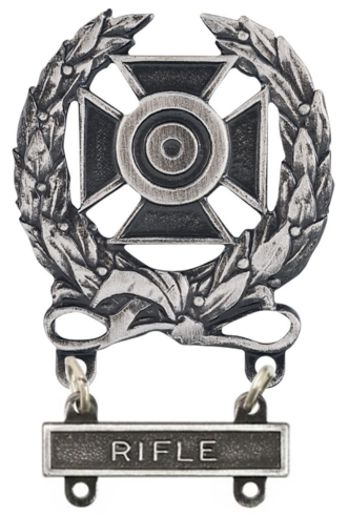

1st row	Beret flash of the 5th Special Forces Group	Shoulder insignia of Special Forces	Unofficial insignia of MACV-SOG
2nd row	Combat Infantryman Badge		Parachutist Badge
Ribbons	Silver Star	Soldier's Medal	Bronze Star Medal
	Purple Heart	Air Medal	Commendation Medal
	Army Commendation Medal with "V" device	National Defense Service Medal	Vietnam Service Medal
	Vietnam Campaign Medal	Presidential Unit Citation	Gallantry Cross (South Vietnam)
Badges	Sharpshooter Marksman badge		Expert Marksman badge for rifle and machine gun.
