= William M. Beecher =

American novelist (1933–2024)

- Born: May 27, 1933; Framingham, Massachusetts, U.S.
- Died: February 9, 2024 (aged 90); Wilmington, North Carolina, U.S.
- Education: Harvard University (BA); Columbia University (MS)
- Occupations: Novelist; journalist

William M. Beecher (May 27, 1933 – February 9, 2024) was an American correspondent in Washington for The Boston Globe, The Wall Street Journal and The New York Times. He also served as Washington bureau chief for the Minneapolis Star Tribune. He spent two years as a senior official of the Defense Department and ten years as a top official of the Nuclear Regulatory Commission. He authored eight novels. In retirement, he was an adjunct professor at the University of Maryland. Beecher died on February 9, 2024, at the age of 90.

== Education ==
Beecher earned a B.A. from Harvard University, where he was an editor of The Harvard Crimson, and an M.S. from Columbia University. During his college career he worked as campus correspondent for The Boston Globe and The Boston Herald Traveler.

== Career ==
Beecher worked for the New York Times from 1966 to 1973. His articles revealed Operation Menu (secret bombings of Cambodia) to the public.

From 1973 to 1975, Beecher served as the acting assistant secretary for public affairs at the Department of Defense. He became a correspondent for international affairs at the Boston Globe after leaving the DOD. At the Boston Globe, he received the Pulitzer Prize in 1983 as part of a team that reported on the nuclear arms race.

He later became the Washington bureau chief for the Minneapolis Star Tribune. Beecher also served as the director of public affairs for the Nuclear Regulatory Commission. After his retirement, he taught journalism at the University of Maryland.

Beecher authored the following novels: Mayday Man (1990), Submerged Rage: The Hidden Grievance (2005), The Acorn Dossier (2009), Nuclear Revenge (2010), The KGB Hoax (2013), Arabella Undercover (2014), Double Agent Stallion (2015) and Jihadi Revenge (2016).

== Personal life ==
Beecher and Eileen Brick married in 1958 and they had four daughters. He was widowed in 2020.
