= 8th Battalion, Royal Australian Regiment =

Former Australian Army unit

- Active: 1966–1973
- Country: Australia
- Branch: Australian Army
- Type: Infantry
- Engagements: Vietnam War
- Decorations: Gallantry Cross Unit Citation (South Vietnam)
- Battle honours: Vietnam (1970–71)

Insignia
- Unit colour patch

The 8th Battalion, Royal Australian Regiment (8 RAR) was an Australian Army Regular infantry battalion. The battalion was formed in July 1966 as part of an expansion of the Australian Army in the mid-1960s due to the perceived threat of Communism in southeast Asia. Initially the battalion was sent to Malaysia in 1967, before later being sent to South Vietnam as part of Australia's commitment to the Vietnam War. Between November 1969 and October 1970 the battalion undertook operations as part of the 1st Australian Task Force, before being brought back to Australia. In October 1973, after Australia's involvement in Vietnam officially ended, the battalion was amalgamated with 9 RAR to form 8/9 RAR.

== History ==
8 RAR was formed at Enoggera Barracks in Brisbane on 14 July 1966 as part of the expansion of the Army during Australia's involvement in the Vietnam War. On 8 August 1966 it had a strength of 370 men, including 150 experienced soldiers who had been posted across from 1 RAR. The battalion was expanded the next month with both regular soldiers and conscripts.

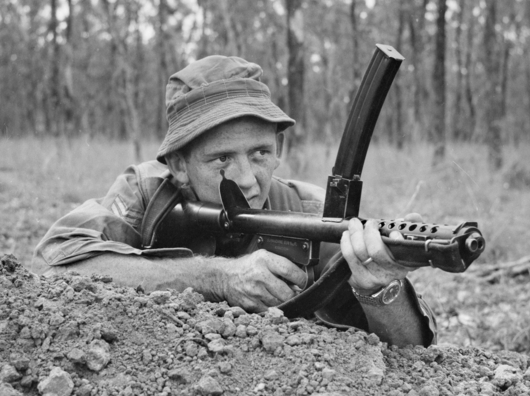
An 8 RAR soldier armed with an F1 submachine gun during a training exercise in July 1967

After a period of training 8 RAR embarked overseas in 1967. In January it was warned that it would relieve 4 RAR in Malaysia, and this movement gradually took place from 24 August to 6 November. While in Malaysia the battalion formed part of the 28th Independent Commonwealth Infantry Brigade which also included New Zealand Army and British Army units.

8 RAR returned to Enoggera in April 1969 and began intensive training ahead of being deployed to South Vietnam. The battalion arrived in South Vietnam on 17 November 1969 and replaced 9 RAR six days later. Like the other Australian Army units in Vietnam, the battalion formed part of the 1st Australian Task Force and was based in Phuoc Tuy province.

In early 1970 8 RAR took part in Operation Hammersley, a reconnaissance operation in the Long Hải area. This operation began on 10 February and on 18 February it captured a large bunker complex after the Vietcong (VC) defenders withdrew following air raids. The operation continued until 9 March, with the battalion carrying out patrols and conducting ambushes in order to engage VC troops. These operations were successful, and 8 RAR was awarded the South Vietnamese Government's Meritorious Unit Commendation, including Cross of Gallantry with Palm Unit Citation for its role in the operation.

8 RAR's main task was participating in and supporting pacification operations in Phuoc Tuy. This involved patrolling the province in order to engage VC units and prevent them from making contact with the civilian population. From 12 June 1970 these operations were designated Operation Cung Chung and were intensified. 8 RAR's tour of South Vietnam ended in October 1970, by which time it had lost 18 men killed in action and suffered 108 wounded. As part of the reduction of the Australian force in South Vietnam 8 RAR was not replaced by another battalion when it returned to Enoggera.

The reduction in the size of the Army at the end of Australia's involvement in the Vietnam War led to 8 RAR being amalgamated. On the morning after the Australian Labor Party won the 1972 Federal Election the battalion, like all others in the Army, was ordered to discharge all conscripts who did not wish to remain. This led to a large reduction in the size of the Army, and in 1973 it was decided to reduce the Royal Australian Regiment from nine to five battalions. This change was implemented by merging ('linking') several battalions, and on 31 October 8 RAR was linked with 9 RAR to form 8/9 RAR.

Members of 8 RAR received the following decorations during its deployment to Vietnam: one Distinguished Service Order, three Military Crosses, two Military Medals and 13 Mentions in Despatches.

== Battle honours ==
- Vietnam 1970–71.

== Commanding officers ==
The following officers commanded 8 RAR:

- Lieutenant Colonel J.O. Langtry (1966–1969)
- Lieutenant Colonel K.J. O'Neill (1969–1970)
- Lieutenant Colonel A. Clunies-Ross (1971)
- Major I.S.A. Power (1971)
- Lieutenant Colonel J.M. Murphy (1971–1973)
- Lieutenant Colonel A. Clunies-Ross (1973)
