= Operation Patio =

Part of the Vietnam War (1970)

- Part of the Vietnam War
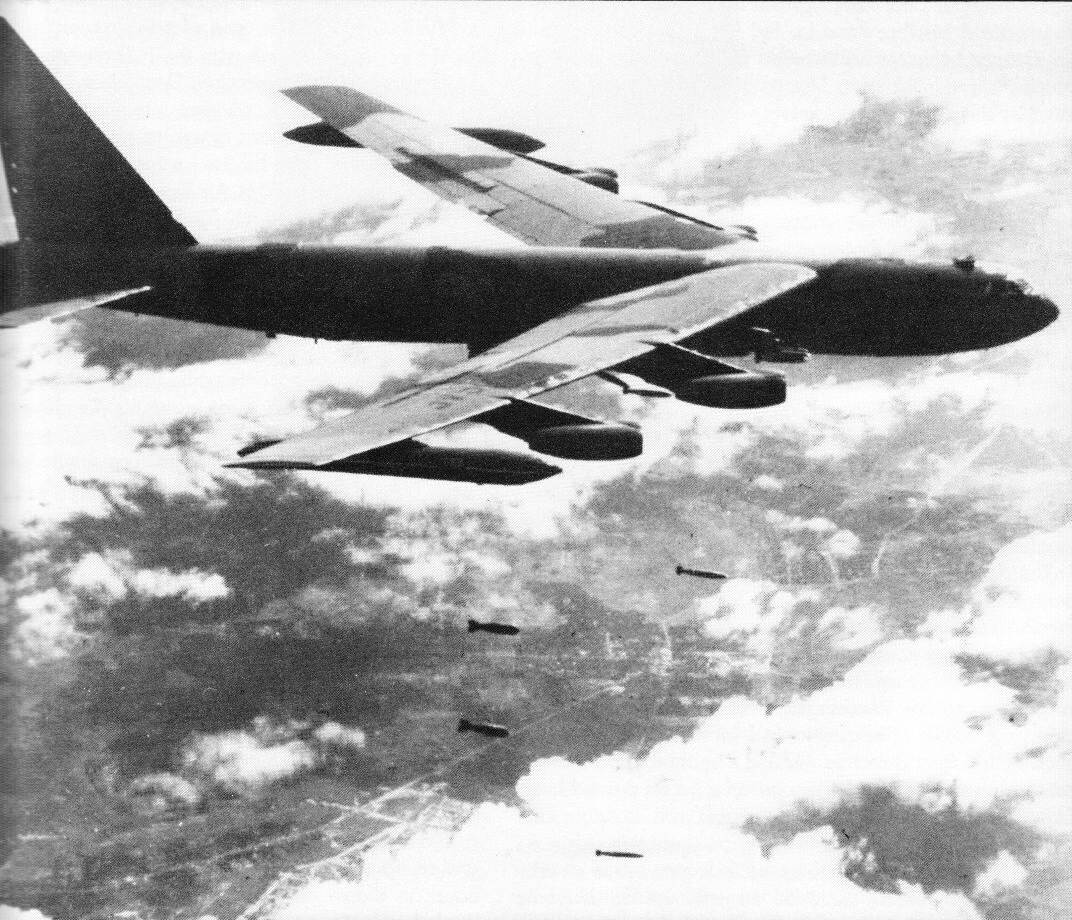
- B-52 over Cambodia
Date	24–29 April 1970
Location	eastern Cambodia

Belligerents
United States	North Vietnam (Democratic Kampuchea) Khmer Rouge

Operation Patio was a covert aerial interdiction effort conducted by the U.S. Seventh Air Force in Cambodia from 24 to 29 April 1970 during the Vietnam War. It served as a tactical adjunct to the heavier B-52 Stratofortress bombing missions being carried out in Operation Menu.

== Background ==
On 18 March 1970, Cambodia's chief of state, Prince Norodom Sihanouk, was removed from power by the National Assembly led by the pro-American Defense Minister, General Lon Nol). The government (after negotiating with North Vietnam had promptly demanded the removal of all People's Army of Vietnam (PAVN) troops from its territory. The deadline was set for 13 March. These forces had occupied the eastern border region contiguous with the South Vietnam for the previous ten years. These border sanctuaries and Base Areas were of strategic significance to the North Vietnamese effort in South Vietnam, however, and they were not going to give them up without a fight.

General Creighton Abrams, U.S. commander in Saigon was pleased by the turn of events in Cambodia. Although Lon Nol had not immediately attacked PAVN, he was much more amenable to the U.S. than had been the mercurial Sihanouk. For the past year and half, Abrams had also been bombarded by requests for the authorization of airstrikes by the highly-secret Military Assistance Command, Vietnam Studies and Observations Group or SOG. SOG's reconnaissance teams had been conducting operations "over the fence" in Cambodia for three years but could still not obtain close air support, either to cover their operations or to strike lucrative PAVN logistical targets in the Base Areas.

== Operation Patio ==
On 18 April, Abrams requested authority from the Joint Chiefs of Staff to utilize U.S. tactical aircraft based in South Vietnam for a 30-day period. These aircraft would be acting in concert with Operation Menu, the highly classified bombing of PAVN sanctuaries and Base Areas in eastern Cambodia by USAF B-52 bombers. Two days later the Joint Chiefs granted his request. All communications and messages concerning the operation were to be sent through special, secure channels and aircraft conducting the missions were assigned cover targets in Laos in the same way that the B-52s of Menu were assigned false targets in South Vietnam.

The first strike of the operation was launched on 24 April and plans called for the operation to last for only 30 days, until the third week of May. The aircraft were authorized to strike targets in northeastern Cambodia extending 8 miles (13 km) west of the South Vietnamese border. On 25 April, the boundary was extended to a depth of 18 miles (29 km). The onset of the Cambodian Campaign by U.S. and South Vietnamese forces on 29 April forced an early termination on 4 May after only 156 had been flown. Operation Patio was quickly superseded by the much more extensive and destructive Operation Freedom Deal.
