= Operation Freedom Deal =

Part of the Vietnam and Cambodian Civil Wars (1970–1973)

- Part of the Cambodian Civil War and the Vietnam War
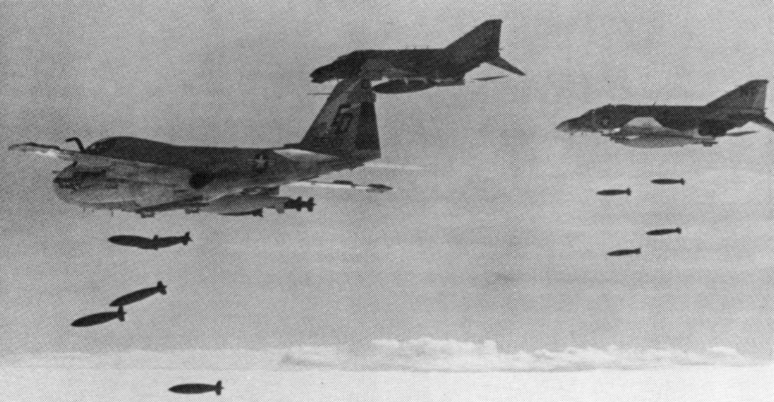
- American planes bombing Cambodia, c. 1973
- Location: Cambodia
- Commanded by: (United States) Richard Nixon (United States) Henry Kissinger (United States) Alexander Haig (United States) Ray B. Sitton
- Date: 19 May 1970 – 15 August 1973
- Executed by: Seventh Air Force
- Outcome: In U.S., adoption of the War Powers Resolution; Delaying the fall of the capital Phnom Penh to the Khmer Rouge; Accelerated collapse of rural Cambodian society, displacement of tens of thousands from the countryside to urban areas, increased social polarization; Pushing North Vietnamese troops further into Cambodia away from the South Vietnamese border; Khmer Rouge used civilian loss to promote recruitment, strengthened the hard-liners within the CPK
- Casualties: Cambodian casualties: 50,000–150,000 (per Ben Kiernan; other estimates vary widely) This figure refers to the entirety of the U.S. bombing of Cambodia, including the Operation Menu bombings. Vietnamese casualties: unknown

Operation Freedom Deal was a military campaign led by the United States Seventh Air Force, taking place in Cambodia between 19 May 1970 and 15 August 1973. Part of the larger Vietnam War and the Cambodian Civil War, the goal of the operation was to provide air support and interdiction in the region. Launched by President Richard Nixon and orchestrated by United States Secretary of State Henry Kissinger, Deputy National Security Advisor Alexander Haig and Colonel Ray Sitton as a follow-up to the earlier ground invasion during the Cambodian Campaign, the initial targets of the operation were the base areas and border sanctuaries of the People's Army of Vietnam (PAVN) and the Viet Cong (VC).

As time went on, most of the bombing was carried out to support the Cambodian Government of Lon Nol in its struggle against the communist Khmer Rouge. The area in which the bombing took place was expanded to include most of the eastern one-half of Cambodia. The bombing was extremely controversial and led the U.S. Congress to pass the War Powers Resolution.

Operation Freedom Deal followed and expanded the bombing of Cambodia conducted under Operation Menu in 1969 and 1970. Most of the bombing was carried out by U.S. Air Force (USAF) B-52 bombers. While the effectiveness of the bombing and the number of Cambodians killed by U.S. bombing remains in dispute, civilian fatalities were easily in the tens of thousands.

== Background ==
With the end of Cambodian neutrality due to the removal of Prince Norodom Sihanouk and installation of pro-U.S. General Lon Nol as president, the Cambodian civil war escalated as the People's Army of Vietnam (PAVN) reacted to military actions by the Cambodians, Americans, and South Vietnamese.

On 15 March 1970, Lon Nol issued an ultimatum to the North Vietnamese, ordering them out of the border areas. The PAVN/VC and their indigenous Khmer Rouge allies had occupied eastern Cambodia for the previous ten years and had established a logistical system and Base Areas along the border during their struggle for a unified Vietnam. They were not about to abandon their zones of control without a fight.

== Operation Patio ==
The newly renamed Khmer Republic (which will herein still be referred to as Cambodia) enlarged the Khmer National Armed Forces (FANK) and launched it against the PAVN. Hanoi's response to the ultimatum and this offensive was the launching of Campaign X in April. PAVN and VC forces easily seized eastern and northern Cambodia, leaving only a few isolated FANK enclaves.

The U.S. responded by first launching Operation Patio, which consisted of tactical airstrikes into Cambodia as an adjunct to the highly classified Operation Menu, the strategic bombardment of the Base Areas by B-52s. The Menu bombing pushed PAVN/VC forces deeper into Cambodia, which led to a more expansive U.S. bombing campaign. The U.S. and South Vietnam then launched offensive ground operations in May 1970 during the Cambodian Campaign.

President Richard M. Nixon, however, had placed a 30 June deadline on the operation, after which all U.S. ground forces had to return to South Vietnam. This did not bode well for the Lon Nol government. Although the incursion had temporarily thrown the PAVN/VC off balance, they and the Khmer Rouge struck back against FANK forces. As a result of this state of affairs, Freedom Deal, the overt air support afforded to the incursion, was extended on 6 June.

== Operation Freedom Deal ==
In the post-incursion period, Freedom Deal was originally an interdiction effort, striking enemy supply lines in eastern Cambodia, and was restricted to a 50-kilometer (30 mi) deep area between the South Vietnamese border and the Mekong River. This restriction was, however, quickly voided due to search and rescue operations conducted by the U.S. Air Force in order to pick up downed South Vietnamese pilots, who regularly flew outside the Freedom Deal zone. Within two months (and without public announcement), the operation was expanded west of the Mekong.

The withdrawal of U.S. forces in May left only South Vietnamese and Cambodian forces to do battle with PAVN/VC and the Khmer Rouge. U.S. tactical aircraft then began supplying FANK troops with direct air support. Meanwhile, Nixon had announced that the policy of the U.S. Air Force was only to interdict PAVN/VC supply networks (in the same manner that they were interdicted in Laos), and that they were only to be conducted within the specified zone (known as the AIZ or Aerial Interdiction Zone).

=== Post-invasion escalation ===
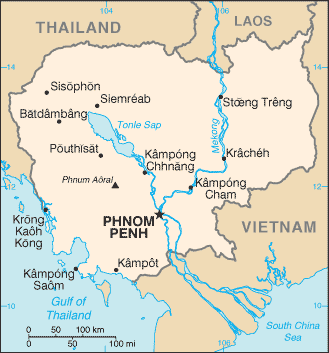
A map of Cambodia

During the rest of the year, the Freedom Deal area of operations was expanded three times. Transcripts of telephone conversations reveal that by December 1970 Nixon's dissatisfaction with the success of the bombings prompted him to order that they be stepped up. "They have got to go in there and I mean really go in," he told U.S. Secretary of State Henry Kissinger. "I want them to hit everything. I want them to use the big planes, the small planes, everything they can that will help out there, and let's start giving them a little shock." Kissinger then relayed Nixon's order, saying, "A massive bombing campaign in Cambodia. Anything that flies on anything that moves." Nixon was inspired to reckless escalation by his belief in the "madman theory".

By the beginning of 1971, the area of operations stretched from Route 7 to the Laotian border in the north and 120 kilometers (75 mi) beyond the Mekong to the west. Between July 1970 and February 1971, approximately 44 percent of the 8,000 sorties flown in Cambodia struck targets outside the authorized zone. This led to Kissinger, Alexander Haig and Colonel Ray Sitton developing a policy of falsifying the reports of missions carried out beyond the boundary.

Most of the strikes were flown in direct support of FANK troops, although American officials continued to deny the fact. Despite this effort, the communists occupied one-half of Cambodia by late 1970 and had cut all the land routes leading to and from the capital of Phnom Penh. In short order the USAF found itself shifting more and more of its diminishing air power from its interdiction campaign in southern Laos to the struggle in Cambodia. In 1971 Cambodian missions made up nearly 15 percent of the total number of combat sorties flown in Southeast Asia, up from eight percent during the previous year.

According to George McTurnan Kahin, Freedom Deal bombers treated the communist-held parts of the country as a virtual "free-fire zone". For most of the campaign, U.S. Ambassador Emory Swank and his team were only allowed to vet targets west of the Mekong. Often they had no idea what villages were being bombed. Swank soon resigned, one of several foreign policy officials who left because of Kissinger's Cambodia policy.

In Cambodia, the ground war dragged on, with the Khmer Rouge doing the bulk of the fighting against the government. On 28 January 1973, the day the Paris Peace Accord was signed, Lon Nol announced a unilateral cease-fire and U.S. airstrikes were halted. When the Khmer Rouge refused to respond, the bombing resumed on 9 February. The U.S. Seventh Air Force argued that the bombing prevented the fall of Phnom Penh in 1973 by killing 16,000 of 25,000 Khmer Rouge fighters besieging the city.

In March the U.S. Joint Chiefs of Staff proposed a much expanded bombing campaign. From then until the end of the operation on 15 August, sortie and tonnage rates increased. By the last day of Operation Freedom Deal (15 August 1973), 250,000 tons of bombs had been dropped on the Khmer Republic, 82,000 tons of which had been released in the last 45 days of the operation.

== Outcome ==
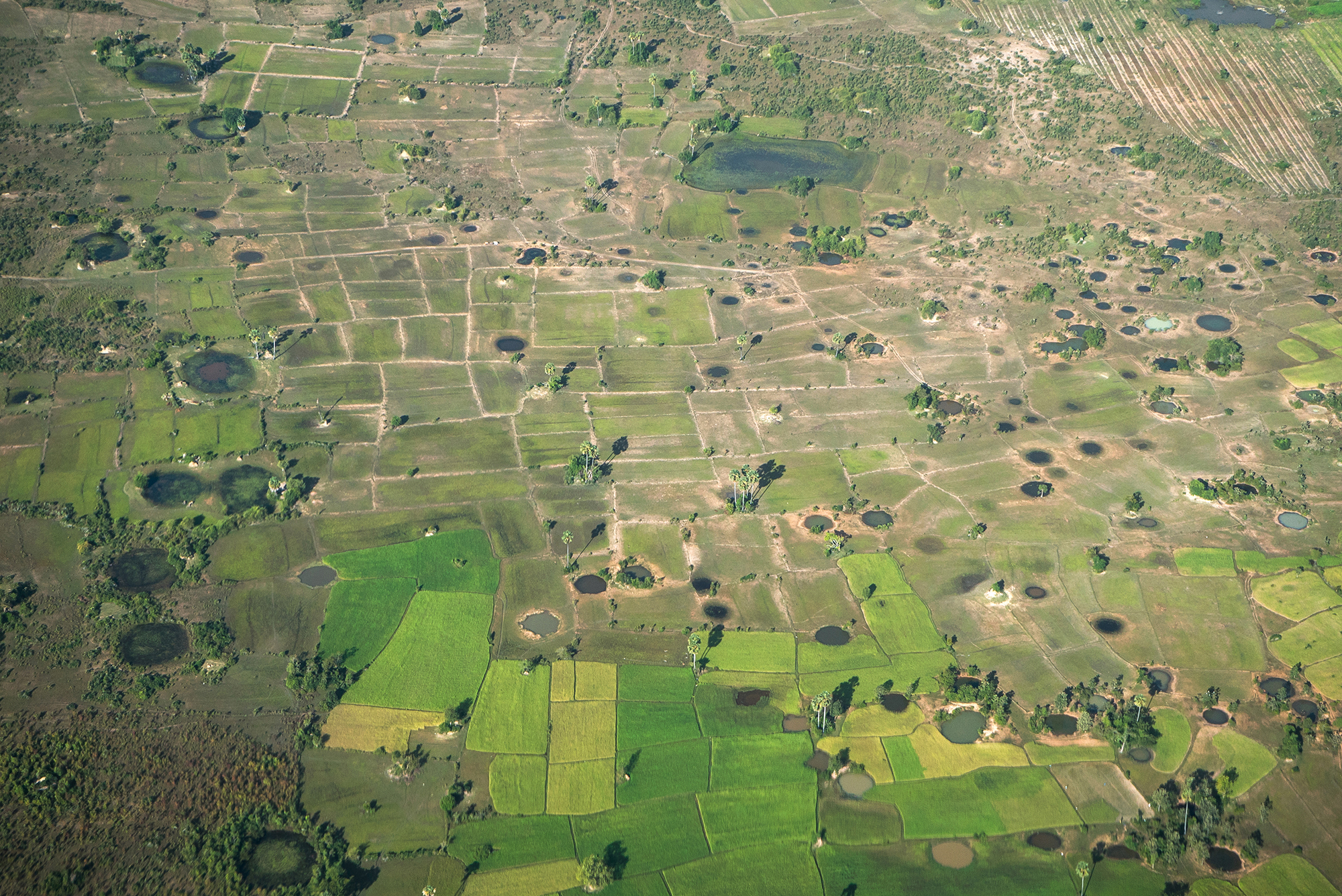
An aerial view of bomb craters in Cambodia

During 1973 Freedom Deal aircraft dropped 250,000 tons of bombs (primarily high explosive), more than the 180,000 tons dropped on Japan during the Second World War. As Khmer Rouge forces drew a tighter ring around Phnom Penh in April, the U.S. Air Force flew more than 12,000 bombing sorties and dropped more than 82,000 tons of bombs in support of Lon Nol's forces during the last 45 days of the operation. Since the inception of the Menu bombings in March 1969, the total amount of ordnance dropped on Cambodia reached 539,129 tons. On 15 August, the last mission of Freedom Deal was flown.

According to David Chandler: "If you just made a very cold, calculating, military decision, the bombing of 1973 was in fact a sensible thing to do [at the time], because had it not happened, the Khmer Rouge would have taken Phnom Penh [much earlier] and South Vietnam would have had a communist country on its flank."

In contrast, Pulitzer prize-winning correspondent Sidney Schanberg asserted that the campaign actually fostered the Khmer Rouge's growth, recalling that the militia men "would point... at the bombs falling from B-52s as something they had to oppose if they were going to have freedom. And it became a recruiting tool until they grew to a fierce, indefatigable guerrilla army.".

== Cambodian deaths caused by U.S. bombing ==
U.S. bombing of Cambodia extended over the entire eastern half of the country and was especially intense in the heavily populated southeastern quarter of the country, including a wide ring surrounding the largest city of Phnom Penh. In large areas, according to maps of U.S. bombing sites, it appears that nearly every square mile of land was hit by bombs with roughly 500,000 tons of bombs dropped.

When extensive bombing by the U.S. of Cambodia began in 1969 it was primarily directed against the PAVN/VC and their supply lines and bases. As the PAVN/VC dispersed their operations deeper into Cambodia to escape U.S. bombing the area bombed by the U.S. expanded. Increasingly, U.S. bombing missions had the objective of supporting the government of Cambodia in its war against the insurgent Khmer Rouge.

The number of deaths caused by U.S. bombing has been disputed and is difficult to disentangle from the broader Cambodian Civil War. Estimates as wide-ranging as 30,000 to 600,000 have been cited. Sihanouk used a figure of 600,000 civil war deaths, while journalist Elizabeth Becker reported over one million civil war deaths, military and civilian included, although other researchers could not corroborate such high estimates. Marek Sliwinski notes that many estimates of the dead are open to question and may have been used for propaganda, suggesting that the true number lies between 240,000 and 310,000.

Judith Banister and E. Paige Johnson described 275,000 war deaths as "the highest mortality that we can justify". Patrick Heuveline states that "Subsequent reevaluations of the demographic data situated the death toll for the [civil war] in the order of 300,000 or less". Of these civil war deaths, Sliwinski estimates that approximately 17.1% can be attributed to U.S. bombing, noting that this is far behind the leading causes of death, as the U.S. bombing was concentrated in under-populated border areas. Ben Kiernan attributes 50,000 to 150,000 deaths to the U.S. bombing. In the 1970s, conservative columnists alleged that Kiernan was pro-Khmer Rouge, but his work subsequently passed university peer review. According to former diplomat Larry Clinton Thompson, 150,000 seems to be the best estimate.

Another impact of the U.S. bombing and the Cambodian civil war was the destruction of homes and livelihood of many people. This was a large contributor to the refugee crisis in Cambodia with two million people—more than 25 percent of the population—displaced from rural areas into cities, especially Phnom Penh which grew from about 600,000 in 1970 to an estimated population of nearly 2 million by 1975. The Cambodian government estimated that more than 20 percent of property in the country had been destroyed during the war.

The legacy of unexploded bombs has had a long-term impact on agriculture in the affected areas. More fertile soil is often softer, and thus bombs impacting such soil are less likely to explode. Farmers in formerly bombed regions often work less fertile soil due to the perceived risk of uncovering unexploded bombs.
