= Fishhook (Cambodia) =

Former salient in southeast Cambodia

Coordinates: 11°45′00″N 106°15′00″E

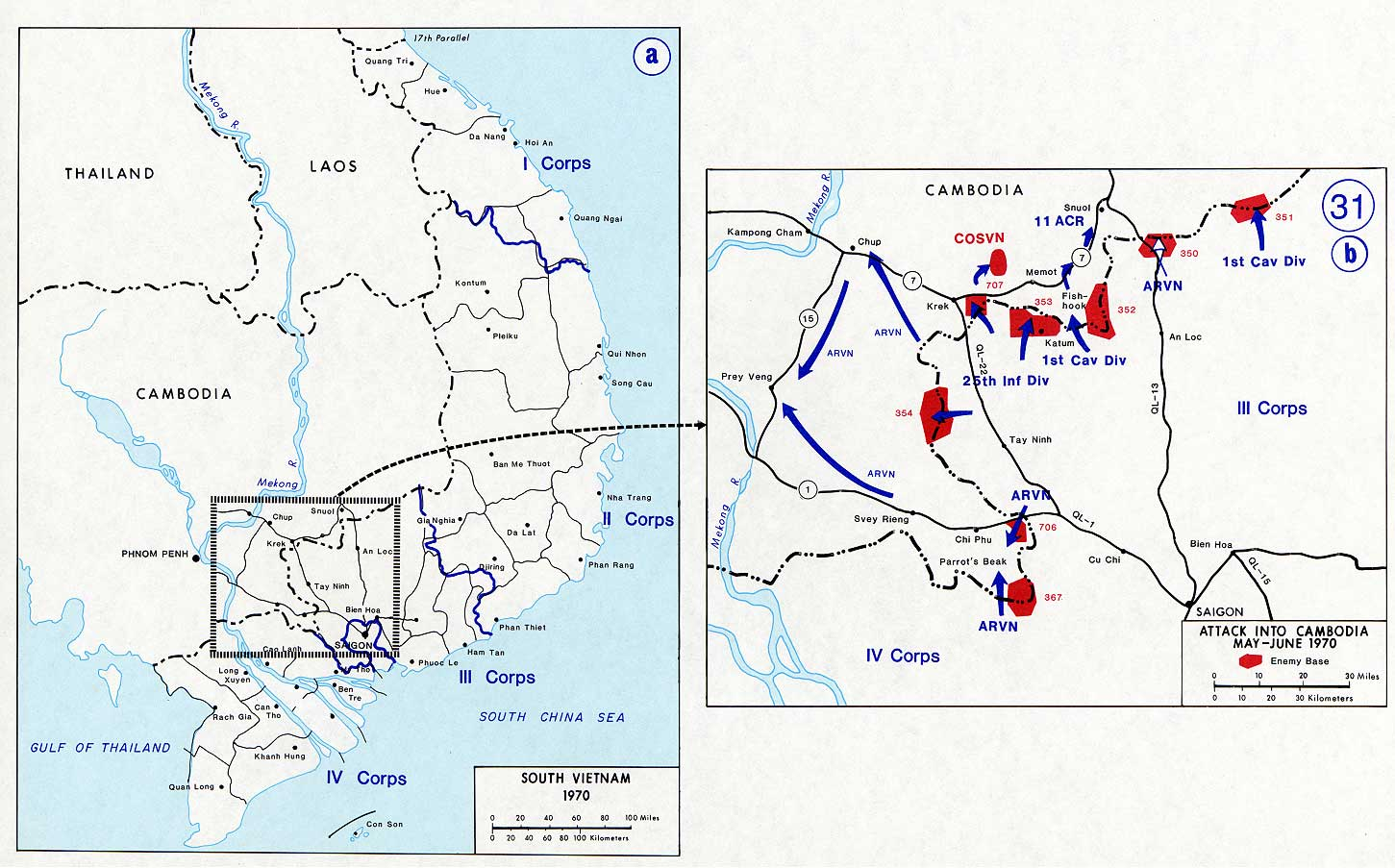
A map of the Cambodian Incursion, showing the Fishhook to the upper left

The Fishhook was the name given to a salient of Kampong Cham Province, southeast Cambodia that protrudes into Bình Long and Tây Ninh provinces, Vietnam, approximately 80 km northwest of Saigon. The area consisted of generally flat plains adjacent to Mimot northeast through roughly rolling plains; and east to the roughly dissected hills and low mountains near O'Rang. Multi-canopied, dense undergrowth forest was the dominant natural vegetation throughout the area. Rubber plantations were found primarily in the western section.

During the Vietnam War the Fishhook was a base and rest area for the People's Army of Vietnam (PAVN) and the Vietcong and one of the terminus points of the Ho Chi Minh trail/Sihanouk Trail. The PAVN established Base Areas 352 and 353 in the Fishhook and elements of the PAVN 7th Division were also based there. US intelligence agencies believed that the Central Office for South Vietnam (COSVN), the PAVN's political and military headquarters was also located within the Fishhook.

On 18 March 1969, the Fishhook was the target of Operation Breakfast, a raid by 48 B-52 Stratofortress bombers, in the first phase of the secret bombing of Cambodia.

On 24 April 1969, a further B-52 raid took place on the suspected location of COSVN. A platoon from MACV-SOG was inserted to conduct a post-strike intelligence-gathering raid. The 24-man MACV-SOG team came under fire as soon as it was inserted and 14 men were eventually evacuated some 8 hours later. Two Americans and 5 Montagnards were killed, while one American, MSGT Jerry "Mad Dog" Shriver was listed as MIA, later changed to presumed dead.

On 1 May 1970, the Fishhook was attacked as part of the Cambodian Incursion. The Army of the Republic of Vietnam (ARVN) 3rd Airborne Brigade air assaulted into the area north of the Fishhook to seal off escape routes and begin operations to the south. Simultaneously, Taskforce Shoemaker comprising the 3rd Brigade, 1st Cavalry Division on the west and the 11th Armored Cavalry Regiment on the south and east attacked north across the Cambodian Border. The 1st Squadron, 9th Cavalry conducted screening operations in the task force area of operations while elements of the ARVN 9th Regiment and the 1st Armored Cavalry Regiment screened to the east in Bình Long Province adjacent to the Fishhook.

All elements then conducted search and interdiction operations to locate and exploit PAVN lines of communication and cache sites. The attack did not discover COSVN, but instead found "The City", a vast logistics area covering 3 square km, comprising 182 storage bunkers containing 1282 individual weapons, 202 crew-served weapons, 30 tons of rice and large amounts of ammunition and explosives. Documents indicated that the City was the supply base for the PAVN 7th Division.
