= Parrot's Beak, Cambodia =

Cambodian salient

Coordinates: 11°02′15.3″N 106°00′35″E

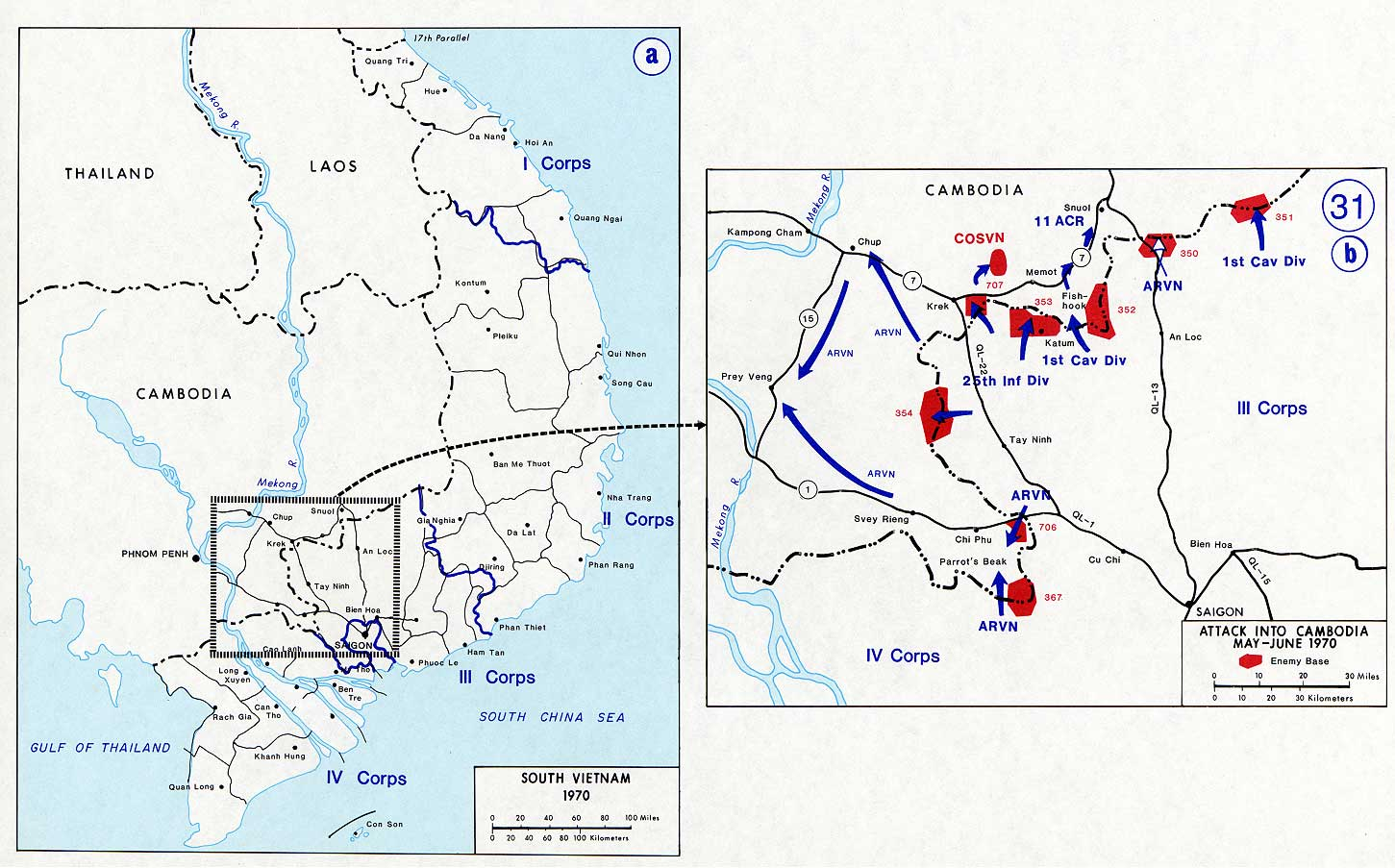
A map of the Cambodian Incursion, showing the Parrot's Beak to the lower left.

Parrot's Beak (vùng mỏ két, vùng mỏ vẹt) was the name given to a salient of Svay Rieng Province, southeast Cambodia that protrudes into Hậu Nghĩa and Kien Tuong Provinces, Vietnam, approximately 65 km north-west of Saigon.

== History ==
In the aftermath of Siamese–Vietnamese War (1841–1845), the region was part of the Gia Định Province of the Empire of Đại Nam, later it became part of French Cochinchina. In July 1867, the French Cochinchina government ceded part of the Trảng Bàng Inspection (including the Parrot's Beak areas) to the Kingdom of Cambodia under a treaty with King Norodom. The Parrot's Beak is returned to Cambodia under the administration of Svay Theab District.

During the Vietnam War the Parrot's Beak was a base and rest area for the People's Army of Vietnam (PAVN) and the Vietcong and one of the terminus points of the Ho Chi Minh Trail/Sihanouk Trail. The PAVN established Base Areas 367 and 706 in the Parrot's Beak.

On 30 April 1970, the Parrot's Beak was attacked by US and ARVN forces during the Cambodian Incursion.

The Parrot's Beak was seized by the PAVN during their retaliatory attack against the Khmer Rouge in December 1977/January 1978 as part of the border hostilities that triggered the Cambodian-Vietnamese War
