= Operation Menu =

1969–1970 US covert military operation in Cambodia

- Part of the Vietnam War
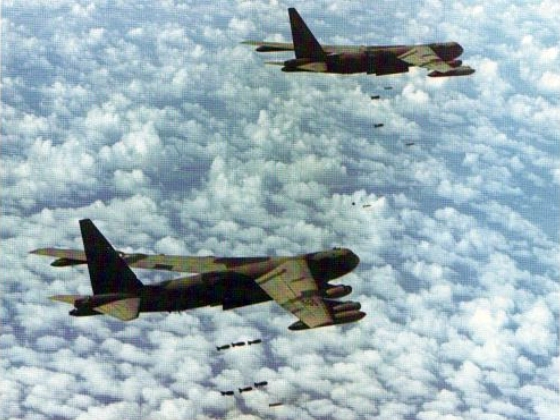
- B-52D bombers carry out a strike
- Operational scope: Tactical bombing
- Location: Eastern Cambodia
- Date: 18 March 1969 – 26 May 1970
- Executed by: United States Strategic Air Command (SAC)
- Outcome: Strategic failure: PAVN/VC and material losses; Failure to prevent North Vietnamese forces from operating in the country; Failure to kill COSVN leadership

Operation Menu was a covert United States Strategic Air Command (SAC) tactical bombing campaign conducted in eastern Cambodia from 18 March 1969 to 26 May 1970 as part of the Vietnam War. The targets of these attacks were sanctuaries and base areas of the People's Army of Vietnam (PAVN – commonly referred to during the war as the North Vietnamese Army, NVA) and the Viet Cong (VC), which used them for resupply, training, and resting between campaigns across the border in the Republic of Vietnam (South Vietnam). The impact of the bombing campaign on the Khmer Rouge guerrillas, the PAVN, and Cambodian civilians in the bombed areas is disputed by historians.

An official United States Air Force record of US bombing activity over Indochina from 1964 to 1973 was declassified by US President Bill Clinton in 2000. The report provides details of the extent of the bombing of Cambodia, as well as of Laos and Vietnam. According to the data, the Air Force began bombing the rural regions of Cambodia along its South Vietnam border in 1965 under the Johnson administration; this was three and a half years earlier than previously believed. From 1965 to 1968, 214 tons of bombs were dropped over Cambodia. The Menu bombings were an escalation of what had previously been tactical air attacks. Newly inaugurated President Richard Nixon authorized for the first time use of long-range Boeing B-52 Stratofortress heavy bombers to carpet bomb Cambodia.

Operation Freedom Deal immediately followed Operation Menu. Under Freedom Deal, B-52 bombing was expanded to a much larger area of Cambodia and continued until August 1973.

== Background ==
From the onset of hostilities in South Vietnam and the Kingdom of Laos in the early 1960s, Cambodia's Prince Norodom Sihanouk had maintained a delicate domestic and foreign policy balancing act. Convinced of the inevitable victory of the communists in Southeast Asia and concerned for the future existence of his government, Sihanouk swung toward the left in the mid-1960s.

In 1966, Sihanouk made an agreement with Zhou Enlai of the People's Republic of China that would allow PAVN and VC forces to establish base areas in Cambodia and to use the port of Sihanoukville for the delivery of military material. The US, heavily involved in South Vietnam, was not eager to openly violate the asserted neutrality of Cambodia, which had been guaranteed by the Geneva Accord of 1954.

Beginning in 1967, President Lyndon B. Johnson authorized covert reconnaissance operations by the Military Assistance Command, Vietnam Studies and Observations Group (MACV-SOG). The mission of the highly classified unit was to obtain intelligence on the PAVN/VC base areas (Project Vesuvius) that would be presented to Sihanouk in hopes of changing his position.

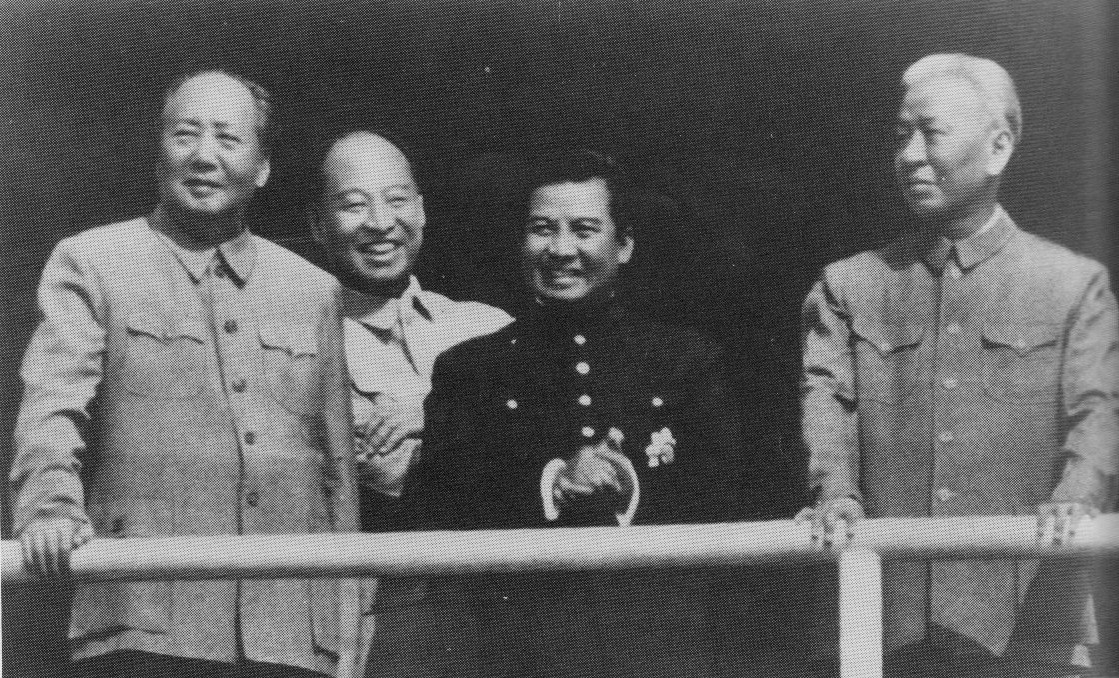
Meeting in Beijing in 1965: Mao Zedong, Prince Sihanouk, and Liu Shaoqi (from left to right)

By late 1968, Sihanouk, under pressure from the political right at home and from the US, agreed to more normalized relations with the Americans. In July 1968, he had agreed to reopen diplomatic relations and, in August, formed a Government of National Salvation under the pro-US General Lon Nol. Newly inaugurated President Richard M. Nixon, seeking any means by which to withdraw from Southeast Asia and obtain "peace with honor", saw an opening with which to give time for the US withdrawal, and time to implement the new policy of Vietnamization.

Nixon had promised during the election of 1968 if elected, to continue the peace talks which started in Paris in May 1968, thereby ruling out seeking a military solution to the war and to continue Johnson's approach of seeking a diplomatic solution. Nixon's main opponent, Vice President Hubert Humphrey, was also committed to a diplomatic solution, and Nixon had presented himself during the election as the man best capable of reaching a favorable peace deal in Paris. Only George Wallace of the American Independent Party had committed himself during the election to fight on in Vietnam until a military victory, winning 13% of the vote.

The diplomatic settlement Nixon wanted was to be on American terms by preserving South Vietnam. A key aspect of Nixon's approach was what he himself called the "madman theory" under which he was to act like he was a dangerous leader capable of any act up to and including nuclear war to intimidate North Vietnam into a diplomatic settlement on American terms. Nixon believed that the Chinese had signed the Korean Armistice Agreement in July 1953 because of the threats made by Eisenhower in the spring of 1953 to use nuclear weapons in Korea, and that strategic bombing or the mere threat of strategic bombing would force the North Vietnamese to sign an armistice similar to that agreement. Nixon conceded that his election promises ruled out a "military victory", but as he often said in private he did not want to be "the first president of the United States to lose a war".

Before the diplomatic amenities with Sihanouk were even concluded, Nixon had decided to deal with the situation of PAVN/VC troops and supply bases in Cambodia. He had already considered a naval blockade of the Cambodian coast, but was talked out of it by the Joint Chiefs of Staff (JCS), who believed that Sihanouk could still be convinced to agree to ground attacks against the base areas.

On 30 January 1969, Chairman of the Joint Chiefs Earle Wheeler suggested to the president that he authorize the bombing of the Cambodian sanctuaries. He was seconded on 9 February by the U.S. commander in Vietnam, General Creighton W. Abrams, who also submitted his proposal to bomb the Central Office of South Vietnam (COSVN), the elusive headquarters of PAVN/VC southern operations, located somewhere in the Fishhook region of eastern Cambodia. Abrams claimed to Nixon that the regions of eastern Cambodia to be bombed were underpopulated and no civilian deaths would be caused, but documents showed that he and other generals were aware that eastern Cambodia was indeed populated and "some Cambodian casualties would be sustained in the operation".

The plans for the bombing was opposed by the Defense Secretary Melvin Laird who doubted the bombings could be kept secret and feared the reaction of Congress and public opinion, Secretary of State William P. Rogers who feared the bombings would derail the peace talks in Paris, and the National Security Adviser Henry Kissinger who feared that Nixon was acting rashly. None of them raised moral objections to the bombings.

On 22 February, during the period just following the Tết holidays, PAVN/VC forces launched an offensive. Nixon became even more angered when the communists launched rocket and artillery attacks against Saigon, which he considered a violation of the "agreement" he believed had been made when the US halted the bombing of North Vietnam in November 1968.

Nixon, who was en route to Brussels for a meeting with North Atlantic Treaty Organization (NATO) leaders, ordered Kissinger to prepare for airstrikes against PAVN/VC base areas in Cambodia as a reprisal. The bombings were to serve three purposes: they would show Nixon's tenacity; they would disable the PAVN's offensive capability to disrupt the US withdrawal and Vietnamization; and they would demonstrate US determination, "that might pay dividends at the negotiating table in Paris." Nixon then cabled Colonel Alexander Haig, a National Security Council staff aide, to meet him in Brussels along with Colonel Raymond Sitton, a former Strategic Air Command (SAC) officer on the JCS staff, to formulate a plan of action.

Nixon would have liked to resume bombing North Vietnam, but he was informed by the State Department that would cause the collapse of the peace talks in Paris. Public opinion polls in 1968–1969 showed the majority of the American people supported the strategy of seeking a diplomatic solution to the Vietnam War via the Paris peace talks. The bombing of Cambodia was part of Nixon's "madman theory" that was meant to intimidate North Vietnam by showing that he was a dangerous leader capable of anything.

By seeking advice from high administration officials, Nixon had delayed any quick response that could be explicitly linked to the provocation. He decided to respond to the next provocation and didn't have long to wait. On 14 March, communist forces once again attacked South Vietnam's urban areas and Nixon was ready. On 16 March, Nixon summoned Kissinger, Laird, Rogers, and Wheeler to a meeting at the White House to announce that he decided that bombing Cambodia was the "only way" to make North Vietnam compromise because he felt he had "to do something on the military front...something they will understand".

Nixon decided to keep the bombing a secret from the American people as to admit to bombing an officially neutral nation would damage his credibility and because bombing Cambodia would seem like he was escalating the war. Under the US constitution, the power to declare war rests with Congress, and several constitutional experts testified before Congress in 1973 that by launching a bombing offensive in 1969 without obtaining the approval of Congress or indeed even informing Congress, Nixon had committed an illegal act. In 1969, the mood of Congress was such that it was extremely unlikely that Congress would have granted approval had Nixon asked for it, hence his decision to circumvent Congress by launching the bombing offensive while keeping it secret.

== Breakfast to Dessert ==
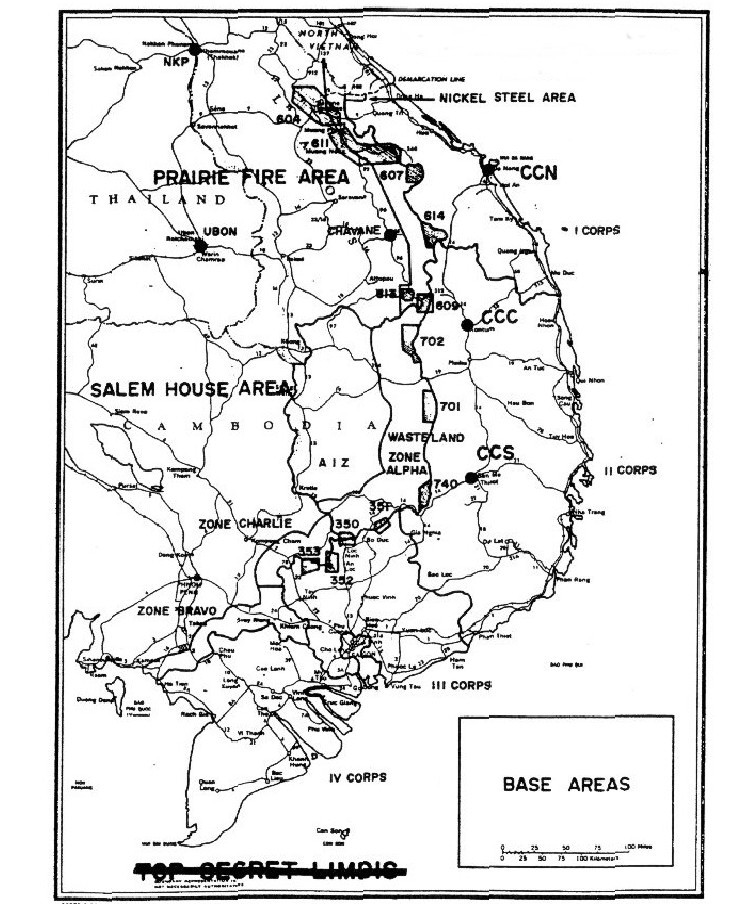
A map of base areas used in Operation Menu

In his diary in March 1969, Nixon's chief of staff, H. R. Haldeman, noted that the final decision to carpet bomb Cambodia "was made at a meeting in the Oval Office Sunday afternoon, after the church service." In his diary on 17 March 1969, Haldeman wrote: "Historic day. K[issinger]'s "Operation Breakfast" finally came off at 2:00 pm our time. K really excited, as is P[resident]." And the next day: "K's 'Operation Breakfast' a great success. He came beaming in with the report, very productive. A lot more secondaries than had been expected. Confirmed early intelligence. Probably no reaction for a few days, if ever."

The bombing began on the night of 18 March with a raid by 60 B-52 Stratofortress bombers, based at Andersen Air Force Base, Guam. The target was "Breakfast" Base Area 353 [11.745° N, 106.162° E], the supposed location of COSVN in the Fishhook. Although the aircrews were briefed that their mission was to take place in South Vietnam, 48 of the bombers were diverted across the Cambodian border and dropped 2,400 tons of bombs. The mission was designated "Breakfast", after the morning Pentagon planning session at which it was devised. On 18 March a 13-man recon team from MACV-SOG was landed by helicopter at the Base Area 353 impact site to carry out BDA and determine whether any prisoners could be captured from among the survivors, but they were met by intense enemy fire and only two of the team were rescued.

"Breakfast" was so successful (in US terms) that Abrams provided a list of 15 more known base areas for targeting. The five remaining missions and targets were: "Lunch" (Base Area 609) [14.626° N, 107.518° E]; "Snack" (Base Area 351) [12.073° N, 106.944° E]; "Dinner" (Base Area 352) [11.708° N, 106.424° E]; "Supper" (Base Area 740)[12.326° N, 107.440° E]; and "Dessert" (Base Area 350) [11.971° N, 106.554° E]. SAC flew 3,800 B-52 sorties against these targets, and dropped 108,823 tons of ordnance during the missions. Due to the continued reference to meals in the codenames, the entire series of missions was referred to as Operation Menu. MACV-SOG provided 70% of the Menu bomb damage intelligence.

Nixon and Kissinger went to great lengths to keep the missions secret. In order to prevent criticism of the bombing, an elaborate dual reporting system of the missions had been formulated during the Brussels meeting between Nixon, Haig, and Colonel Sitton.

== System ==
The number of individuals who had complete knowledge of the operation was kept to a minimum. Neither the Secretary of the Air Force nor Air Force's chief of staff were aware of the bombing of Cambodia. All communications concerning the missions was split along two paths – one route was overt, ordering typical B-52 missions that were to take place in South Vietnam near the Cambodian border – the second route was covert, using back-channel messages between commanders ordering the classified missions. For example: Abrams would request a Menu strike. His request went to Admiral John S. McCain, Jr., the Commander-in-Chief, Pacific Command (CINCPAC), in Honolulu.

McCain forwarded it to the JCS in Washington DC, who, after reviewing it, passed it on to Defense Secretary Laird (who might consult with the president). The JCS then passed the command for the strike to General Bruce K. Holloway, Commander of SAC, who then notified Lieutenant General Alvin C. Gillem, Commander of the 3rd Air Division on Guam. During this time Air Force Major Hal Knight was supervising an MSQ-77 Combat Skyspot radar site at Bien Hoa Air Base, South Vietnam. "Skyspot" was a ground directed bombing system which directed B-52 strikes to targets in Vietnam.

Each day a courier plane would arrive from SAC's Advanced Echelon Office at Tan Son Nhut Air Base near Saigon. Knight was given a revised list of target coordinates for the next day's missions. That evening, the coordinates were fed into Olivetti Programma 101 computers. and then relayed to the aircraft as they came on station. Only the pilots and navigators of the aircraft (who had been briefed by Gillem and sworn to secrecy) knew of the true location of the targets.

The bombers then flew on to their targets and delivered their payloads. After the air strikes, Knight gathered the mission paperwork and computer tapes and destroyed them in an incinerator. He then called a phone number in Saigon and reported that "The ball game is over." The aircrews filled out routine reports of hours flown, fuel burned, and ordnance dropped. This dual system maintained secrecy and provided Air Force logistics and personnel administrators with information that they needed to replace air crews or aircraft and replenish stocks of fuel and munitions.

== Exposure ==
Although Sihanouk was not informed by the US about the operation, he may have had a desire to see PAVN/VC forces out of Cambodia, since he himself was precluded from pressing them too hard. After the event, it was claimed by Nixon and Kissinger that Sihanouk had given his tacit approval for the raids, but this is dubious. Sihanouk told US diplomat Chester Bowles on 10 January 1968, that he would not oppose American "hot pursuit" of retreating North Vietnamese troops "in remote areas [of Cambodia]", provided that Cambodians were unharmed.

Kenton Clymer notes that this statement "cannot reasonably be construed to mean that Sihanouk approved of the intensive, ongoing B-52 bombing raids ... In any event, no one asked him. ... Sihanouk was never asked to approve the B-52 bombings, and he never gave his approval." During the course of the Menu bombings, Sihanouk's government formally protested "American violation[s] of Cambodian territory and airspace" at the United Nations on over 100 occasions, although it "specifically protested the use of B-52s" only once, following an attack on Bu Chric in November 1969.

On 9 May 1969, an article by military reporter William M. Beecher exposing the bombing was run in the New York Times. Beecher claimed that an unnamed source in the administration had provided the information. Nixon was furious when he heard the news and ordered Kissinger to obtain the assistance of FBI Director J. Edgar Hoover to discover the source of the leak. Hoover claimed that Kissinger had told him that "we will destroy whoever did this". Hoover suspected Kissinger's own NSC aide, Morton Halperin, of the deed and so informed Kissinger. Halperin's phone was then illegally tapped for 21 months.

This was the first in a series of illegal surveillance activities authorized by Nixon in the name of national security. The phones of 13 officials together with four journalists were illegally tapped by the FBI in search of finding the leak. The administration was relieved when no other significant press reports concerning the operation appeared, and the revelation of the secret bombing of Cambodia did not cause any public outrage. Journalist Stanley Karnow asserted that the illegal bugging in May 1969 marked "the first abuses of authority" under Nixon that ultimately led to the Watergate scandal.

Likewise, Congressman John Conyers wrote that the Operation Menu bombings led Nixon and his staff to become "enmeshed in the snare of lies and half-truths they themselves had created". Conyers wrote that Nixon's belief that any action done by the president was justified in name of national security, first asserted with Operation Menu, created the mindset that led him directly to the Watergate scandal.

By the summer, five members of the United States Congress had been informed of the operation. They were Senators John C. Stennis (MS) and Richard B. Russell, Jr. (GA), and Representatives Lucius Mendel Rivers (SC), Gerald R. Ford (MI), and Leslie C. Arends (IL). Arends and Ford were leaders of the Republican minority and the other three were Democrats on either the Armed Services or Appropriations committees.

For those in Washington who knew of the Menu raids, the silence of one party came as a surprise. The Hanoi government made no protest concerning the bombings. It neither denounced the raids for propaganda purposes, nor, according to Kissinger, did its negotiators "raise the matter during formal or secret negotiations." North Vietnam had no wish to advertise the presence of their forces in Cambodia, allowed by Sihanouk in return for the Vietnamese agreeing not to foment rebellion in Cambodia.

== Revelations ==
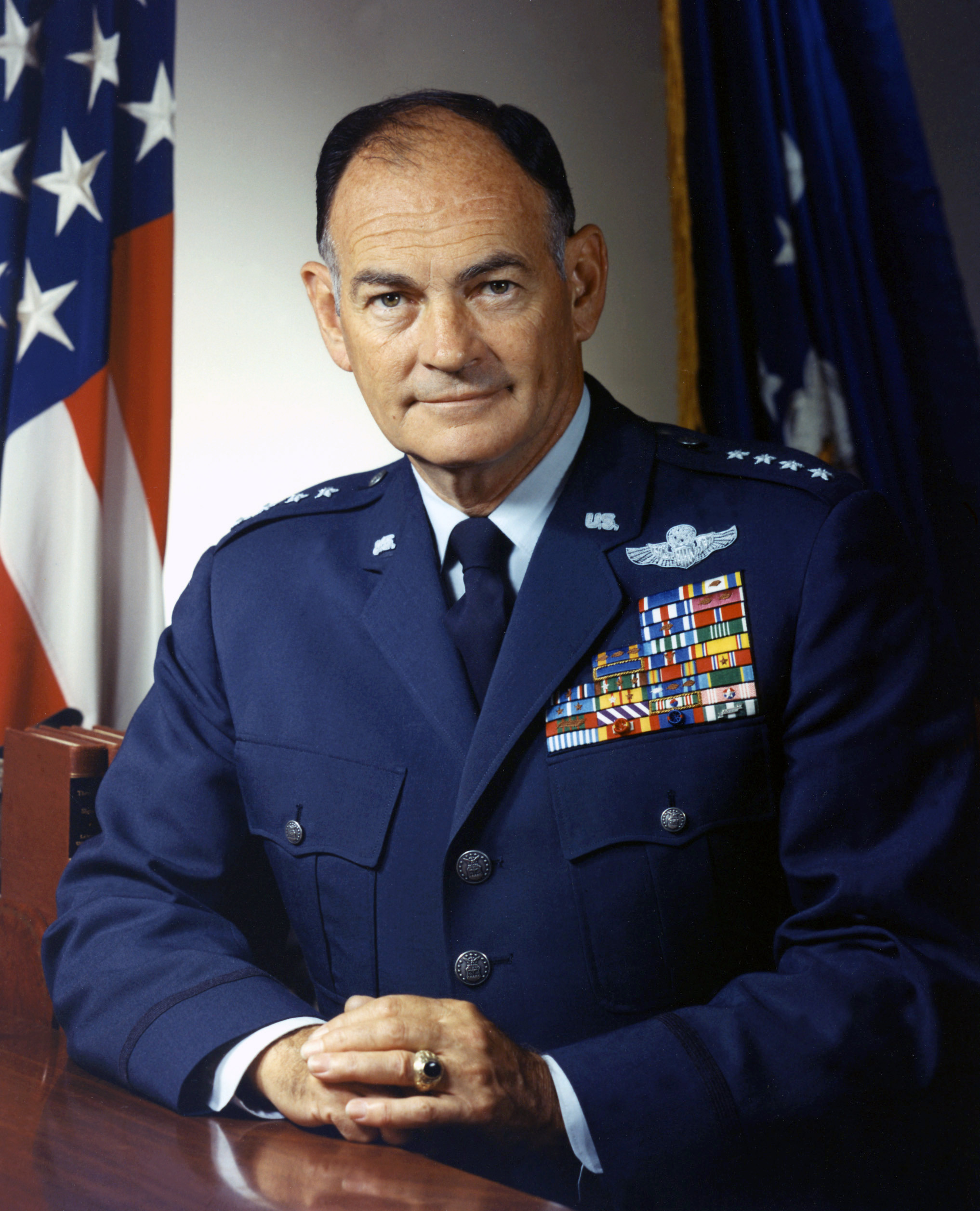
Air Force General George S. Brown, the man who informed the Senate Armed Services Committee

For four years Menu remained unknown to the US Congress as a whole. That changed in December 1972, when Major Knight wrote a letter to Senator William Proxmire (D, WI), asking for "clarification" of U.S. policy on the bombing of Cambodia. Knight, who had become concerned over the legality of his actions, had complained to his superior officer, Colonel David Patterson. He later received several bad efficiency reports, which ruined his career, and he was discharged from the Air Force.

Proxmire's questioning led to hearings of the Senate Armed Services Committee, which eventually demanded that the Department of Defense turn over all records of US air operations in Cambodia. When they arrived, the records did not even mention the Menu strikes. The committee was not convinced and the investigation continued. Less than two weeks later, it opened hearings on the nomination of General George S. Brown for the position of chief of staff of the Air Force. As commander of the Seventh Air Force in South Vietnam, Brown had been privy to Menu and disclosed as much to the committee.

For the next eight days the committee listened to the testimony of administration officials and the JCS, who tried to justify their actions. The committee uncovered excuses and deceptions that were perhaps more alarming than those occurring simultaneously in the Watergate hearings. The Menu revelations raised "fundamental questions as to military discipline and honesty, of civilian control over the military and of Congressional effectiveness." It was basically agreed, both by Congress and concerned military officers, that the deception employed during Menu went beyond covertness.

According to Air Force historian Captain Earl H. Tilford: "Deception to fool the enemy was one thing, but lying to Congress and key members of the government, including the chief of staff of the Air Force and the secretary of the Air Force, was something else." Congressman Conyers wrote that the bombing of Cambodia without congressional authorization was an illegal act which Nixon should have been impeached for. Conyers introduced a motion of impeachment against Nixon regarding the bombing of Cambodia on the floor of the House on 30 July 1974, which was not taken up as the House was fully engaged in the Watergate scandal at the time.

== Civilian casualties ==
There are no confirmed estimates of Cambodians killed, wounded, or rendered homeless by Operation Menu. The Department of Defense estimated that the six areas bombed in Operation Menu (Breakfast, Lunch, Dinner, Snack, Dessert, and Supper) had a non-combatant population of 4,247. DOD planners stated that the effect of attacks could tend to increase casualties, as could the probable lack of protective shelters around Cambodian homes.

Each of the target areas was small. Area 353 (Breakfast), was 25 square kilometres (9.7 sq mi) in size and had an estimated population of 1,640 people. B-52s flew 228 sorties into this single area to bomb. Each B-52 carried up to 108 bombs weighing 225 kilograms (496 lb) and spread them equally over a "box" about 1.5 kilometers long by one-half kilometer wide (1 mile by 0.3 miles); thus, nearly 25,000 bombs may have been dropped in Area 353 alone. The other target areas had similar saturation rates of bombs.

Following Operation Menu, Operation Freedom Deal continued the bombing of Cambodia for an additional three years and extended the bombing to at least one-half of the country.

== Aftermath ==
The constitutional issues raised at the hearings became less important when the House Judiciary Committee voted (21–12) against including the administration's falsification of records concerning Menu in the articles of impeachment leveled against Nixon. One of the key issues that prevented congressional inclusion was the embarrassing fact that five key members of both political parties had been privy to the information and none had said or done anything about it.

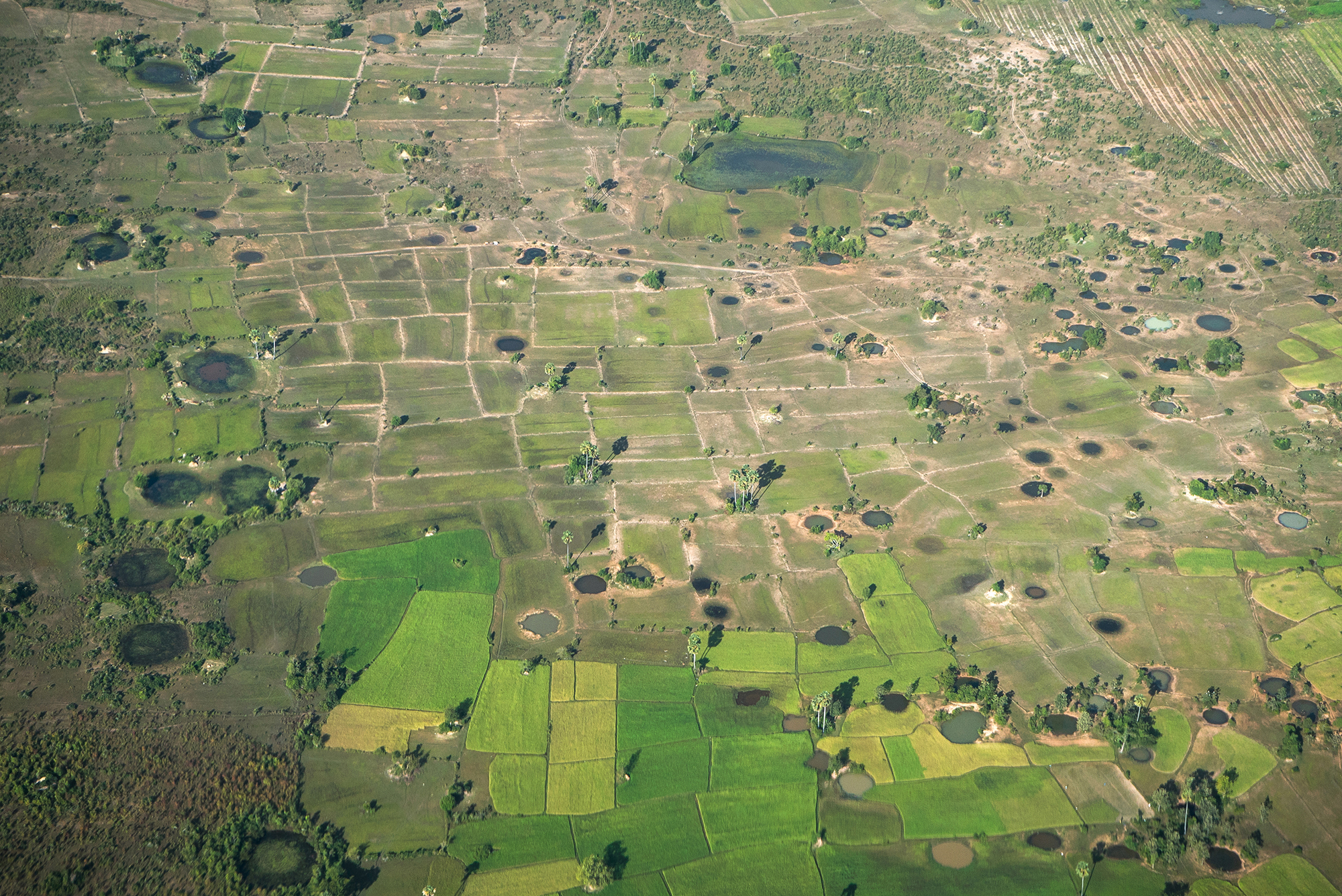
Bomb craters, Cambodia

The consequences of U.S. bombing of Cambodia, positive and negative, are still widely debated by participants and scholars. As for preventing further PAVN/VC offensives, they failed. In May 1969, PAVN/VC launched an offensive similar in size to that of the May Offensive of the previous year. It certainly cost North Vietnam the effort and manpower to disperse and camouflage their Cambodian sanctuaries to prevent losses to further air attack. Nixon claimed the raids were a success, since air power alone had to provide a shield for withdrawal and Vietnamization. They certainly emboldened Nixon to launch the Cambodian Campaign of 1970.

While out of the country on 18 March 1970, Sihanouk was removed from power by the national assembly and replaced by Lon Nol. The Nixon administration, although thoroughly aware of the weakness of Lon Nol's forces and loath to commit US military force to the new conflict in any form other than air power, announced support for the newly proclaimed Khmer Republic. In response, Sihanouk quickly aligned himself with the Khmer Rouge. This was a boon to the communist insurgents, whose movement "started growing as on yeast."

On 29 March 1970, the PAVN launched an offensive against the Khmer National Armed Forces, with documents uncovered after 1991 from the Soviet archives revealing that the invasion was launched at the explicit request of the Khmer Rouge following negotiations with Nuon Chea. Historian Jussi Hanhimäki writes that "the MENU operations pushed the North Vietnamese forces...in east Cambodia westward. American bombers followed suit."

Author William Shawcross and other observers asserted that the "Khmer Rouge were born out of the inferno that American policy did much to create" and that Sihanouk's "collaboration with both powers [the United States and North Vietnam] ... was intended to save his people by confining the conflict to the border regions. It was American policy that engulfed the nation in war."

Shawcross was challenged by former Kissinger aide Peter Rodman as follows:

When Congress, in the summer of 1973, legislated an end to U.S. military action in, over, or off the shores of Indochina, the only U.S. military activity then going on was air support of a friendly Cambodian government and army desperately defending their country against a North Vietnamese and Khmer Rouge onslaught ... What destabilized Cambodia was North Vietnam's occupation of chunks of Cambodian territory from 1965 onwards for use as military bases from which to launch attacks on U.S. and South Vietnamese forces in South Vietnam.

Kissinger in an interview with Theo Sommer defended the bombing, saying:

People usually refer to the bombing of Cambodia as if it had been unprovoked, secretive U.S. action. The fact is that we were bombing North Vietnamese troops that had invaded Cambodia, that were killing many Americans from these sanctuaries, and we were doing it with the acquiescence of the Cambodian government, which never once protested against it, and which, indeed, encouraged us to do it. I may have a lack of imagination, but I fail to see the moral issue...

The simultaneous rise of the Khmer Rouge and the increase in area and intensity of U.S. bombing between 1969 and 1973 has incited speculation as to the relationship between the two events. Ben Kiernan, Director of the Genocide Studies Program at Yale University, said the following:

Apart from the large human toll, perhaps the most powerful and direct impact of the bombing was the political backlash it caused ... The CIA's Directorate of Operations, after investigations south of Phnom Penh, reported in May 1973 that the communists there were successfully 'using damage caused by B-52 strikes as the main theme of their propaganda' ... The U.S. carpet bombing of Cambodia was partly responsible for the rise of what had been a small-scale Khmer Rouge insurgency, which now grew capable of overthrowing the Lon Nol government ...

Shawcross's and Kiernan's views were echoed in a 2011 statistical study of US bombing in Vietnam which concluded that the air war "was counterproductive ... hampered the pacification campaign and more of it would likely have hastened the communist victory." Kang Kek Iew, a Cambodian war criminal and leader in the Khmer Rouge movement, said during his war crimes tribunal in 2009 that "Mr Richard Nixon and [Henry] Kissinger allowed the Khmer Rouge to grasp golden opportunities".

When Phnom Penh was under siege by the Khmer Rouge in 1973, the US Air Force again launched a bombing campaign against them, claiming that it had saved Cambodia from an otherwise inevitable communist take-over and that the capital might have fallen in a matter of weeks. By 1975, President Ford was predicting "new horrors" if the Khmer Rouge took power, and calling on Congress to provide additional economic, humanitarian, and military aid for Cambodia and Vietnam.

== See also ==
- Operation Rolling Thunder
