= Ray B. Sitton =

United States Air Force general

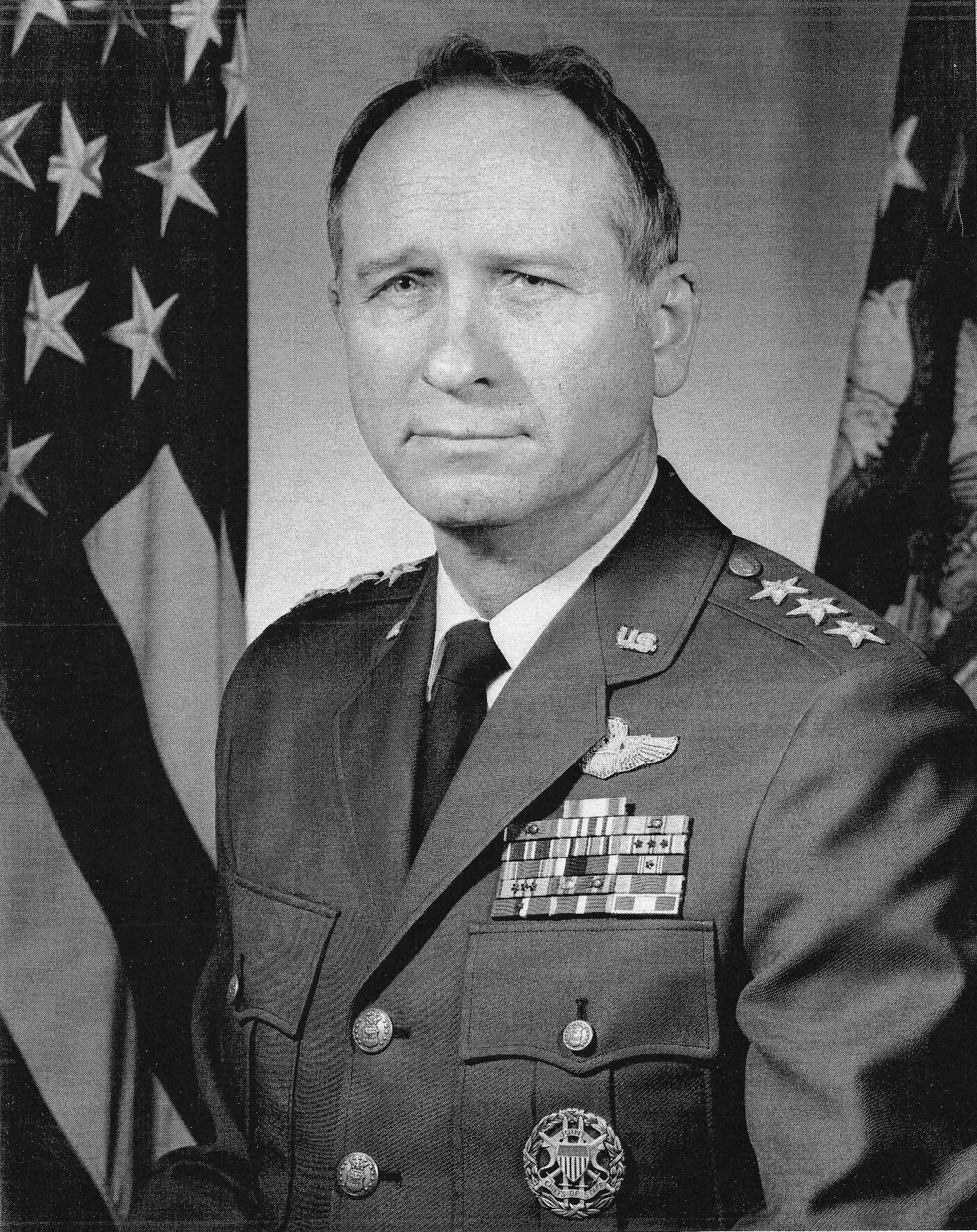
- Sitton photographed in January 1976
- Born: November 6, 1923; Calhoun, Georgia, U.S.
- Died: August 16, 2013 (aged 89); Pensacola, Florida, U.S.
- Military career
- Allegiance: United States of America
- Branch: United States Army Air Forces; United States Air Force
- Service years: 1942–1977
- Rank: Lieutenant General
- Awards: Distinguished Service Medal with oak leaf cluster; Legion of Merit with oak leaf cluster; Joint Service Commendation Medal; Air Force Commendation Medal with oak leaf cluster; Air Force Outstanding Unit Award Ribbon

Ray Benjamin Sitton (November 6, 1923 – August 16, 2013) was an American lieutenant general, command pilot and navigator. He was Director of the Joint Staff, Organization of the Joint Chiefs of Staff, Washington, D.C.

== Biography ==
Sitton was born on November 6, 1923, in Calhoun, Georgia, where he graduated from Sonoraville High School as valedictorian of the Class of 1941. He received a Bachelor of Science degree in military science from the University of Maryland in 1954, and a master's degree in international affairs from the George Washington University in 1967.

He entered the Enlisted Reserve in August 1942 and was called to active duty in February 1943. Through the Army Air Corps aviation cadet training program, he received his pilot wings and commission as a second lieutenant at Eagle Pass Army Air Field, Texas, in December 1943.

== Service ==
During World War II, he served as a basic flying instructor at Independence Army Air Field, Kan., and in February 1945 he went to the Southwest Pacific area where he was a pilot, adjutant and aide-de-camp with XI Corps East Air Forces.

From October 1947 to January 1950, he served in a variety of positions with the Air Proving Ground, Eglin Air Force Base, Fla., including adjutant and group personnel officer, and during this period attended the Air Tactical School. He next attended the University of Colorado. In September 1950, he was assigned to Headquarters U.S. Air Force as chief of the Top Secret Branch in the Staff Message Division. He entered the Air Command and Staff School, Maxwell Air Force Base, Ala., in January 1954.

Sitton was transferred to Korea in August 1954 and assigned to the 5th Air Force where he served as air operations officer, chief of the Flight Section, and chief, Operations and Training Branch, 314th Air Division. He returned to the United States in August 1955, attended pilot aerial observer training at James Connally Air Force Base, Texas, and was awarded his navigator wings. He next was assigned to the B-47 pilot transition course at McConnell Air Force Base, Kan.

In August 1956 he went to Homestead Air Force Base, Fla., where he held a variety of positions, including B-47 aircraft commander, squadron operations officer, squadron commander, chief of the 379th Bombardment Wing training division and assistant deputy commander for operations for the wing. In November 1959 he was assigned to the 4137th Strategic Wing at Robins Air Force Base, Ga., where he served as commander of the 342d Bombardment Squadron; commander of the organizational maintenance squadron; and chief of the Operations and Training Division; assistant deputy commander for operations; and deputy commander for operations for the 4137th Wing.

Sitton was assigned to Headquarters Strategic Air Command, Offutt Air Force Base, Neb., in June 1963, first as chief of the Operations and Training Branch, Office of the Inspector General, and in July 1965 was named deputy director of information. He entered the National War College in Washington, D.C., in August 1966 and graduated in July 1967.

Sitton then joined the Organization of the Joint Chiefs of Staff, Washington, D.C., in the Operations Directorate, where he was assistant deputy director for operations for the National Military Command Center; then chief, Current Operations Branch; and lastly chief, Strategic Operations Division.

In June 1970 Sitton assumed duties as commander of the 17th Bombardment Wing, SAC, Wright-Patterson Air Force Base, Ohio, and in May 1971 was named commander of the 19th Air Division, SAC, with headquarters at Carswell Air Force Base, Texas. He assumed duties as assistant deputy chief of staff for plans, Strategic Air Command, at Offutt Air Force Base, Neb., in January 1972; became deputy chief of staff for plans in March 1973; and assumed duties as deputy chief of staff for operations in September 1973.

In July 1974 Sitton was assigned as director for operations (J-3), Joint Staff, Organization of the Joint Chiefs of Staff, Washington, D.C. He assumed those duties in July 1976. Sitton died August 16, 2013, aged 89.

== Decorations and awards ==
He had flown more than 8,500 hours in 40 different types of aircraft, and was authorized to wear the Master Missileman Badge. His military decorations and awards include:

- Air Force Distinguished Service Medal with oak leaf cluster
- Legion of Merit with oak leaf cluster
- Joint Service Commendation Medal
- Air Force Commendation Medal with oak leaf cluster
- Air Force Outstanding Unit Award Ribbon.
