= List of military operations of the Laotian Civil War =

The following is a list of military operations staged within the Military Regions of Laos during the Laotian Civil War. They are listed in chronological order of their start date. Also listed are the Military Region(s) in which they were staged. The list is believed to be reasonably complete. Any additions need sources.

While all the operations listed were part of the Laotian Civil War, not all of them were combat operations or battles. Coups, invasions, civic action projects, military training and procurement, and an opium smuggling incursion are included among the operations.

== 1958–1962 ==
  - March–April 1958: Operation Booster Shot, nationwide
  - 22 January 1959–19 April 1961: Project Hotfoot (Laos), nationwide
  - December 1958: North Vietnamese invasion of Laos, in Military Region 3 (MR 3)
  - 25 December 1959: 1960 Laotian coups, in Military Region 5 (M5)
  - 10 August 1960: 1960 Laotian coups, in MR 5
  - 13–16 December 1960: Battle of Vientiane, in MR 5
  - 17 January 1961–30 September 1974: Operation Momentum, in Military Region 2 (MR 2)
  - 31 January–6 June 1961: Battle of Ban Pa Dong, in Military Region 1 (MR 1)
  - 13 March–August 1961: Operation Millpond, nationwide, (cancelled)
  - 13 December 1961–10 September 1962: Operation Pincushion, in Military Region 4 (MR 4)
  - January–5 May 1962: Battle of Luang Namtha, in MR 1

== 1963–1967 ==
  - 25 May 1963: Chinese Road begins in MR 1
  - Summer 1963–1972: Operation Hardnose, in MR 3 and MR 4
  - November 1963–January 1964: Battle of Lak Sao, in MR 3
  - Late 1963–mid-1967: Wapi Project, in MR 4
  - 18 April 1964: 1964 Laotian coups, in MR 5
  - 19–29 July 1964: Operation Triangle, in MR1, MR2, and MR 5
  - 19 July 1964–March 1973: Unity (military operation), in MR 2 and MR 4
  - 4 August 1964: 1964 Laotian coups, in MR 5
  - 14 December 1964—22 February 1973: Operation Barrel Roll, in MR 2
  - 31 January 1965: 1965 Laotian coups, in MR 5
  - 3 April 1965–11 November 1968: Operation Steel Tiger in MR 3 and MR 4
  - Late 1965: Operation Star (Laos), in MR 3
  - 5 December 1965–end of 1968: Operation Tiger Hound in MR 3 and MR 4
  - 17 February 1966: Battles of Nakhang, in MR 2
  - 23 May 1966: Second Battle of Nakhang, in MR 2
  - August 1966–January 1968: Battle of Nam Bac, in MR 1
  - 21 October 1966: 1966 Laotian coup, in MR 5
  - 6 January 1967: Third Battle of Nakhang, in MR 2
  - 9 January 1967: Ban Naden raid, in MR 3
  - 29 July–1 August 1967: 1967 Opium War, on Burmese border of MR 1
  - Late 1967–1968: Team Sone Pet on Chinese border of MR 1

== 1968–1970 ==
  - 23 January 1968: Battle of Ban Houei Sane, in MR 3
  - 10–11 March 1968: Battle of Lima Site 85, in MR 2
  - 26 November 1968–7 January 1969: Operation Pigfat, in MR 2
  - 28 February 1969: Fourth Battle of Nakhang, in MR 2
  - 17 March–7 April 1969: Operation Raindance, in MR2
  - 12 March 1969: Battles of Bouamlong, in MR 2
  - 18–27 June 1969: Campaign Toan Thang, in MR 2
  - 21–26 June 1969: Operation Left Jab in MR 4
  - 1–15 July 1969: Operation Off Balance, in MR 2
  - 28 July–17 October 1969: Operation Junction City Jr., in MR 3
  - 6 August–30 September 1969: Kou Kiet, in MR 2
  - 13 September 1969–25 April 1970: Campaign 139, in MR 2
  - 20 September 1969–9 March 1970: Operation Diamond Arrow, in MR 4
  - 15 November 1968–29 March 1969: Operation Commando Hunt, in MR 3 and MR 4
  - 2–26 July 1970: Operation Maeng Da, in MR 3
  - 31 August–mid-December 1970: Operation Honorable Dragon, in MR 4
  - 11–13 September 1970: Operation Tailwind, in MR 4
  - 26 September 1970–7 January 1971: Operation Counterpunch, in MR 2
  - 19 October–13 November 1970: Tchepone Operation, in MR 3

== 1971 ==
  - 1 January–May 1971: Project Copper, in MR 4
  - 5 January–11 February 1971: Operation Silver Buckle, in MR 3
  - 2 February–late May 1971: Campaign 74B, in MR 2
  - 8 February–25 March 1971: Operation Lam Son 719, in MR 4
  - 16 February–29 March 1971: Operation Desert Rat, in MR 3
  - 2 April–20 August 1971: Operation Phalat, along Thai border of MR 1
  - 7 April–27 June 1971: Operation Xieng Dong, in MR 1
  - 15 May–late September 1971: Operation Phoutah, in MR 3
  - 9–11 June 1971: Operation Phiboonpol, in MR 4
  - 27 July–31 October 1971: Operation Sayasila, in MR 4
  - 5 August–25 September 1971: Phou Khao Kham, in MR 5
  - September 1971: Operation Sourisak Montry, along Thai border of MR 1
  - 1–9 November 1971: Operation Bedrock (Laos), in MR 4
  - 1 November–23 December 1971: Operation Thao La, in MR 4
  - 17 December 1971–30 January 1972: Campaign Z, in MR 2
  - 30 December 1971–16 March 1972: Operation Maharat, in MR 1 and MR 5

== 1972–1973 ==
  - 1 February–17 March 1972, Operation Strength I, in MR 2
  - 11 February–ca 31 March 1972, Operation Sinsay in MR 4
  - 6–30 March 1972: Operation Strength II, in MR 2
  - 1–27 April 1972: Operation Fa Ngum, in MR 4
  - June 1972: Operation Sourisak Montry VIII, along Thai border of MR 1
  - 15 June–19 October 1972: Operation Black Lion, in MR 4
  - 26 July–27 September 1972: Operation Phou Phiang II, in MR 2
  - 18 October 1972––22 February 1973: Operation Black Lion III, in MR 4
  - 28 October–27 December 1972: Campaign 972, on the MR2/MR 3 boundary
  - 21 November 1972–22 February 1973: Operation Black Lion V, in MR 4
  - 7 December 1972–early May 1973: The Vinh wiretap originated in MR 4
  - 6 January–5 February 1973: Operation Maharat II, in MR 1
  - 18 January–March 1973: Operation Phou Phiang III, in MR 2
  - 20 August 1973: 1973 Laotian coup, in MR 5
