= Operation Phiboonpol =

- Part of Laotian Civil War; Vietnam War
Date	9 – 11 June 1971
Location	Moung Phalane
Result	Unsuccessful Royalist attempt to capture the Bolaven Plateau

Belligerents
Kingdom of Laos; Supported by United States; Thailand	North Vietnam; Supported by: Soviet Union; People's Republic of China

Units involved
Bataillon Infanterie 20; 1 Special Guerrilla Unit; Bataillon Volontaires 43; Bataillon de Parachutistes 104; Thai mercenary company Royal Lao Air Force; U.S. Air Force	Group 559

Strength
Battalion and regimental-size	~50,000; Three PT-76 tanks

Casualties and losses
Heavy	Heavy

Operation Phiboonpol (9–11 June 1971) was a "short but very intense engagement" of the Laotian Civil War. Five Royal Lao Government battalions went on the offensive in Military Region 4 of the Kingdom of Laos to try to regain the Boloven Plateau, which overlooked the vital Ho Chi Minh Trail lying to its east. Stopped in its tracks by the People's Army of Vietnam, with its first use of tanks in southern Laos, the Royalists held firm while close air support inflicted heavy casualties on North Vietnamese attackers. A Thai mercenary company sent as a Royalist relief force was ambushed and wiped out. For weeks after the battle, vultures feasted on unburied corpses.

== Overview ==
The Ho Chi Minh Trail has been called, "the lifeline of Hanoi's [North Vietnam's] efforts to topple the South Vietnamese government." There were numerous attempts by Royal Lao Government troops—in most cases, irregular military units—to interdict the Trail during the course of the Second Indochina War. Beginning with offensives such as Operation Left Jab and Operation Junction City Jr. in 1969, the Central Intelligence Agency (CIA) continued to direct attacks on the Trail in 1970 in Operation Maeng Da, Operation Honorable Dragon, Operation Diamond Arrow, and the Tchepone Operation. Action against the Trail continued in 1971 with Operation Silver Buckle, Operation Desert Rat, and Operation Phoutah. From the eastern side of the Trail came Operation Lam Son 719 on 8 February 1971.

== Background ==
=== Pathet Lao (PL) defections ===
In November 1970, charismatic Pathet Lao (PL) General Phomma Douangmala, who had been at odds with the Vietnamese communists, died of wounds while in a People's Army of Vietnam (PAVN) hospital. The general's bodyguard captain blamed the Vietnamese for the general's death. On 26 March, the captain led a security platoon of 30 men from the 25th Special Fighters Battalion in its defection to the RLG. Another 89 defectors would follow in the next few days.

The defecting captain supplied information that led to 43 sorties of tactical air strikes hitting the PAVN's Group 968. Then, the defecting platoon was joined by the remainder of the 25th Battalion.

There were an additional 55 PL desertions in April. The commander of the 11th Pathet Lao Battalion was blamed for not preventing defections, and reduced in rank. The 11th Battalion then also defected, commander and men, in mid-April. Distrustful PAVN troops surrounded and disarmed the last PL battalion in the area, the 12th; most of those PL troops then deserted. The continuing defections amounted to the largest in the Laotian Civil War.

=== Royal Lao Government (RLG) reverses ===
On 1 January 1971, Project Copper began as Khmer Republic troops moved in Military Region 4 against the Trail's southern extension, known as the Sihanouk Trail. The home base for Project Copper was Pakse Strip 22 (PS 22). It was garrisoned by a Central Intelligence Agency sponsored paramilitary organization, 1 Special Guerrilla Unit battalion (1 SGU). U.S. Air Force (USAF) fighter-bombers struck communist threats with tactical air strikes. AC-130 gunships also helped fend off any communist threats through January and February 1971.

On 8 February 1971, Operation Lam Son 719 unexpectedly struck at the Ho Chi Minh Trail. The RLG had no prior notice of the South Vietnamese incursion. Laotian Prime Minister Souvanna Phouma claimed that Laotian neutrality depended on non-recognition of military operations in his country, and did not inform his military of the coming incursion. There is no record of how the differing operations affected one another. It is also said that Operation Silver Buckle, begun on 5 January in Military Region 3, was planned as a diversion to Lam Song 719.

On 8 March, PAVN assaults overran PS 22 and three nearby outposts. 1 SGU retreated westward to Houei Kong. By 15 May, the communists had managed to secretively haul heavy weapons within firing range of the central Bolovens intersection of Routes 23 and 232, as well as the village of Pak Song at the junction. Royalist Bataillon Infanterie 20 (BI 20) held the town and its intersection; a contingent of 127 Pathet Lao defectors were stationed on a hilltop northwest of town. About 30 12.7mm machine guns had been brought in by the communists as antiaircraft weapons. With supportive tactical air power kept at bay, and with artillery pounding their position, BI 20 deserted their defenses before PAVN infantry attacked. The PL defectors also fled, but were trapped by PAVN pursuers at the top of a sheer cliff and wiped out. The sickly MR 4 commander tried to rally his troops into a defense at Ban Gnik. This was the situation just prior to Operation Phiboonpol.

== Operation Phiboonpol ==
One history has noted that the Laotian Civil War was marked "...by short but very intense engagements." Certainly, Operation Phiboonpol was such. With all Royalist positions except Ban Gnik on the Bolovens Plateau lost to the communists, that village on the Plateau's western edge became the rallying point for Royalist stragglers. BI 20 and 1 SGU gathered there, but were looking for an excuse to leave the front. Bataillon Volontaires 41 (BV 41) had fallen back from Salavan. Bataillon Volontaires 43 (BV 43) had withdrawn from Attopeu. Also present was a unit from the Forces Armées Neutralistes, Bataillon de Parachutistes 104 (BP 104).

The commanding general of MR 4, Phasouk Somly Rasphakdi, was loath to counterattack. He not only had a demoralized lot of defeated troops to inspire; he also faced the beginning of the rainy season. While the monsoon would clog the communist aggressors' resupply routes, it would also interfere with tactical air support of the Royalists' attacks. Nevertheless, the general's CIA advisors prodded him into the offensive Operation Phiboonpol. On 9 June 1971, his disgruntled force of five battalions moved slightly eastward from Ban Gnik. The following night, a PAVN counterassault headed by three of the first communist tanks ever committed to battle in MR 4 struck and stalled them. As the PT-76 tanks fired upon the Royalist forward command post, U.S. Air Force (USAF) AC-130 gunships could not penetrate heavy cloud cover to offer supportive fire to the Royalists. As daylight came, sunshine burned away the low lying clouds.

The communists began human wave frontal attacks on the Royalists as the fog cleared. Close air support struck the PAVN, inflicting heavy casualties. With eight Royal Lao Air Force T-28 Trojans stationed nearby at Pakse, 88 tactical air strikes hit the communist forces that day, including 14 by one pilot. One attacking tank was also destroyed by the defenders' artillery. Nevertheless, the besieged Royalists were radioing for help.

The response came from Pakse, as a company of Thai mercenaries trundled down Route 23 to the rescue. They dismounted from their trucks several kilometers short of the battle, and began to route march in. They walked into a communist ambush. The mercenaries' extinction was overheard on the radio net. But while this was happening, USAF fighter-bombers arrived with close air support for the Royalists. Among the casualties they inflicted were the destruction of one tank and the damaging of the final one. An estimated 700 PAVN soldiers were killed.

== Results ==
Operation Phiboonpol then settled into fixed positions just west of Ban Gnik. The Royalists thus managed to cling to the Bolovens Plateau, and secure Route 23. For several weeks, vultures feeding on unburied corpses on the battlefield constituted an ongoing danger to pilots flying in the area.

U.S. Ambassador G. McMurtrie Godley believed that RLG control of the Bolovens Plateau was necessary for successful peace negotiations ending the Laotian Civil War. He urged his CIA paramilitary personnel and the Royalist military's General Staff to plan a fresh offensive to take advantage of the monsoon weather.
