= Operation Silver Buckle =

- Part of Laotian Civil War; Vietnam War
Date	5 January – 11 February 1971
Location	Southeast of Tchepone
Result	Royalist attack repulsed; however, at least six North Vietnamese battalions diverted from Operation Lam Son 719

Belligerents
Kingdom of Laos; Supported by United States	North Vietnam

Units involved
Group Mobile 30	304th Division; 308th Infantry Division; 141st Regiment, 2nd Division; 2nd Regiment, 324th Division; Group 968

Strength
Regimental-size	~50,000

Casualties and losses
Heavy	Unknown

Operation Silver Buckle (5 January – 11 February 1971), an offensive staged in Military Region 4 of the Kingdom of Laos, was the deepest Royal Lao Armed Forces penetration to date of the Ho Chi Minh Trail. Reaching the Trailside village of Moung Nong, the forward two companies attacked the rear of the 50,000 People's Army of Vietnam (PAVN) garrison on 8 February 1971, just as Operation Lam Son 719 was launched by the Army of the Republic of Vietnam (ARVN). Overrun and scattered while suffering serious casualties, the Groupement Mobile 30 irregular regiment of Silver Buckle had tied up at least six PAVN battalions, preventing them from opposing Lam Son 719.

== Overview ==
"In short, the North Vietnamese campaign to overthrow the government at Saigon and establish a unified, Communist Vietnam ruled from Hanoi depended on the Ho Chi Minh Trail."

Given the strategic importance of the Trail, there were numerous attempts by Royal Lao Government (RLG) forces—in most cases, irregular military units—to harass and interdict the Trail during the course of the war. Beginning with offensives such as Operation Left Jab and Operation Junction City Jr. in 1969, the Central Intelligence Agency (CIA) continued to direct attacks on the Trail in 1970 in Operation Maeng Da, Operation Honorable Dragon, Operation Diamond Arrow, and the Tchepone Operation.

== Background ==
As 1970 turned into 1971, several events occurred to drastically change the military situation in Military Region 3 (MR 3) of the Kingdom of Laos. First, in November 1970, popular Pathet Lao General Phomma Douangmala, who had been at odds with the Vietnamese communists, died in one of their hospitals. A couple of separatist PL officers had recently been killed. The general's disgruntled bodyguard led the first of a series of Pathet Lao defections.

South of MR 3, in MR 4, Project Copper began on 1 January 1971 as Khmer Republic troops moved against the Trail's southern extension, known as the Sihanouk Trail. The home base for Project Copper was Pakse Strip 22 (PS 22). It was garrisoned by a CIA sponsored paramilitary organization, 1 Special Guerrilla Unit battalion (1 SGU). United States Air Force (USAF) fighter-bombers struck communist threats with tactical air strikes. AC-130 gunships also helped fend off any communist threats through January and February 1971 as the Khmer tried to cut off supplies from Sihanoukville.

== Operation Silver Buckle ==
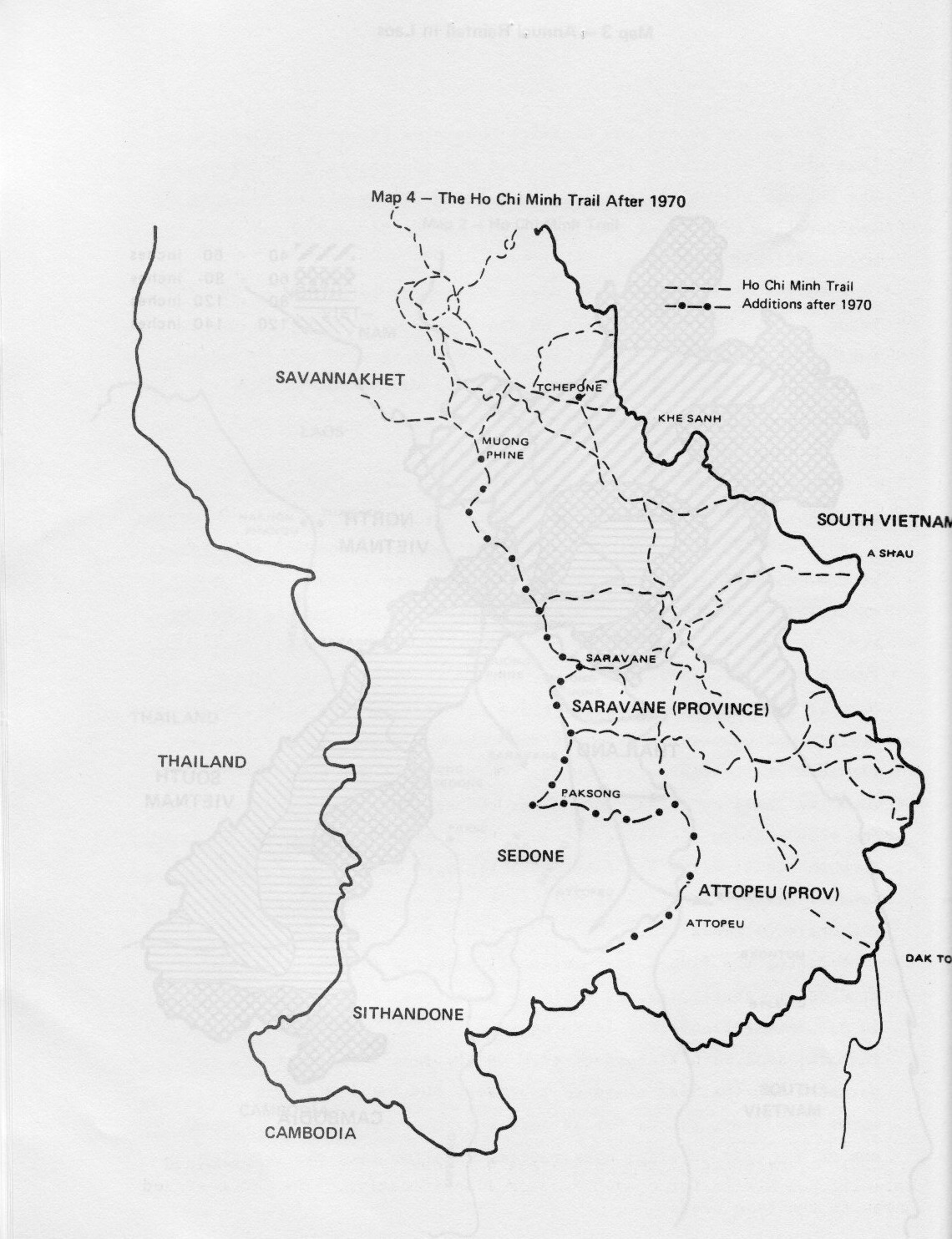
The Ho Chi Minh Trail, 1970. Operation Silver Buckle was fought to the southeast of Tchepone.

Operation Silver Buckle was the first Royal Lao Government test of organizing its CIA sponsored guerrilla battalions in MR3 into regiment-sized units called Groupements Mobile (GM). For the first time, the CIA arranged air support with the USAF well in advance of the operation, and secured a commitment of 18 daily tactical air sorties, with four Nail airborne forward air controllers for visual reconnaissance and air strike direction. A pair of C-123 Provider flareships supplied night time battlefield illumination for the guerrillas. In the event, thunderstorms, haze, and foul weather would seriously limit air support during the operation.

Designed to achieve the same interdictory results desired from the Tchepone Operation but by different means, Silver Buckle kicked off on 5 January 1971. Instead of aiming directly at Tchepone, its objective was an interdiction point some 50 kilometers southeast of that transshipment point.

On 12 January 1971, helicopters escorted by A-1 Skyraiders set the 1,100 troops of Groupement Mobile 30 (GM 30) on a hilltop near the vital PAVN line of communication, Route 92. GM 30 then split in half. Two battalions moved northeastward 20 kilometers toward a village on the edge of the Ho Chi Minh Trail, Muong Nong. This was the deepest penetration yet into the Trail complex. The other two battalions of the regiment headed southeast toward Route 92, met resistance, but still gained the road.

In a rare show of inter-theater cooperation, MACV-SOG landed four of their long-range reconnaissance patrols from South Vietnam on the northern fringe of Tchepone as a diversion, also on 5 January. The teams reported any PAVN troop movements toward the Silver Buckle units. Additionally, from 12 to 17 January, MACV-SOG staged diversions south of Tchepone by faked recon team insertions and resupply drops at 11 locations. The actual recon teams would hang on north of Tchepone until 22 January.

While the MACV-SOG activity took place, the southern column of Silver Buckle laid mines on Route 92. It then turned north to join the other column. In the meantime, on 27 January, the northern column from GM 30 neared Muong Nong. Previous Royalist irregular military offensives during 1970 had drawn the PAVN high command into defending this logistics base. In and around Tchepone resided the equivalent of a PAVN Army Corps—the 304th Division, 308th Division, 141st Regiment of the 2nd Division, the 2nd Regiment of the 324th Division, and other smaller detachments. Two companies from GM 30 sallied into this communist concentration of 50,000 enemy troops, laying mines, calling in air support, and ambushing PAVN trucks.

On 8 February 1971, the ARVN struck at the Ho Chi Minh Trail from the east with Operation Lam Son 719. Just how expected this offensive was to the RLG is uncertain. It is said that Silver Buckle was planned as a diversion to Lam Son 719. It is also claimed that the RLG was totally surprised by the South Vietnamese offensive. While Royalist intent was unclear, PAVN reaction to Silver Buckle was not. On the night of 9 February, two PAVN infantry regiments backed by tanks, antiaircraft guns, and artillery overran the vastly outnumbered Royalists at Moung Nong. Royalist survivors filtered back 80 kilometers to regroup at Ban Houei Mun's airstrip. Meanwhile, PAVN Group 968 came down from the Bolovens Plateau and attacked northward. They dispersed the other column of Silver Buckle, which also headed for Ban Houei Mun. By 11 February, Operation Silver Buckle ended in a full retreat.

== Results ==
By 22 February, the muster at the airstrip showed that GM 30 had taken heavy casualties. On the other hand, they had tied down six or more PAVN battalions and kept them from combating Lam Son 719.

== Aftermath ==
Operation Lam Son 719 was still being fought in heavy engagements. There was still opportunity for a diversion from the Laotian side of the Ho Chi Minh Trail, such as the upcoming Operation Desert Rat.
