= Sub Rosa (disambiguation) =

Sub rosa is a Latin phrase connoting secrecy.

Sub rosa or subrosa may also refer to:

== Arts, media, and entertainment ==
- Sub Rosa (band), a Brazilian rock band
- Subrosa (band), an American alternative rock band
- SubRosa (metal band), a female led American sludge doom metal band
- Sub Rosa (album), a 2003 album by Eagle-Eye Cherry
- Sub Rosa, a 2007 album by the band Mirabilis
- Sub Rosa (novel), a 2010 novel by Canadian writer Amber Dawn
- Roma Sub Rosa, a series of mystery novels by Steven Saylor set in ancient Rome
- "Sub Rosa" (Star Trek: The Next Generation), an episode of Star Trek: The Next Generation
- Sub Rosa (NCIS), an episode of the television series NCIS
- Sub Rosa, an indie FPS MMO published by Devolver Digital

== Other uses ==
- Sub Rosa, a summer house on the Lindenshade farm in Wallingford, Pennsylvania
- Sub Rosa (company), an American design studio
- Sub Rosa (label), a Belgian music label
- Sub Rosa (Pocahontas, Mississippi), a historic mansion in Pocahontas, Mississippi
- Sub Rosa, Arkansas, a ghost town
- Sub Rosa, NZIC Association, the New Zealand Intelligence Corps association
- subRosa, a cyberfeminist art collective
