= Operation Left Jab =

Military offensive in June 1969 as part of the Laotian Civil War and the Vietnam War

- Part of Laotian Civil War; Vietnam War
Date	21–26 June 1969
Location	Southern Laos
Result	Disrupted communist logistics into Cambodia
Territorial changes	Royal Lao forces temporarily cut the Sihanouk Trail

Belligerents
Kingdom of Laos	North Vietnam (Laos) Pathet Lao; Cambodia

Units involved
(Kingdom of Laos) Special Guerrilla Unit 2; 21st Special Operations Squadron	Group 559

Operation Left Jab was the first military offensive launched against the Sihanouk Trail extension of the Ho Chi Minh trail during the Second Indochina War. It was the first battalion-sized operation waged by the Royal Lao Army against the communists in Military Region 4. Carried out between 21 and 26 June 1969, the assault interdicted Route 110 of the Sihanouk Trail for its planned three-day stoppage of military supplies. The Royalist guerrillas of Special Guerrilla Unit 2 then evaded an approaching counterattack and regrouped in friendly territory. Operation Left Jab had cleared the way for Operation Diamond Arrow.

== Overview ==
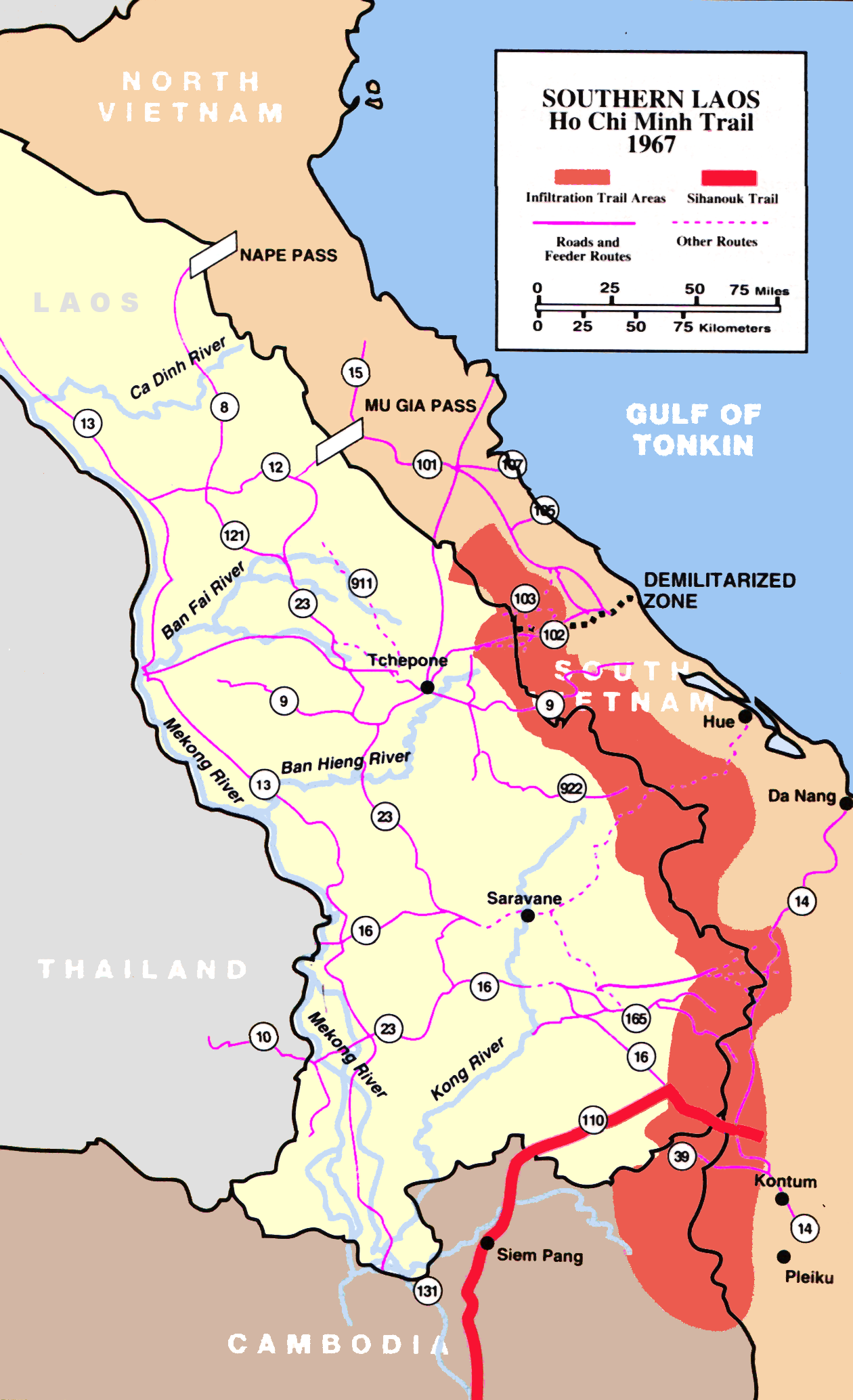
Map of Southern Laos and the Ho Chi Minh Trail network. The Sihanouk Trail portion is limned in dark gold at the bottom of the map.

Located in the southern panhandle of the territory of the Kingdom of Laos, the Ho Chi Minh Trail was the logistics backbone of the communist forces during the Second Indochina War, as it was the main supply route for Viet Cong and People's Army of Vietnam (PAVN) forces fighting in South Vietnam. At the southern end of the Ho Chi Trail was a dirt road, Route 110, and a surrounding network of logistical trails running into Cambodia that comprised the Sihanouk Trail. The Sihanouk Trail connected the Ho Chi Minh Trail with the deep water ocean port of Sihanoukville, the entry point for thousands of tons of communist war materiel. From December 1966 through April 1969, over 21,000 tons of ordnance entered the Sihanouk Trail from the post of Sihanoukville; it was estimated there were sufficient crew-served weapons to equip 240 battalions, and small arms enough for 585 battalions.

Operation Left Jab was the first of a number of military operations waged against the Trail in southern Laos, including missions such as Operation Maeng Da, Operation Honorable Dragon, and Operation Junction City Jr., that originated in Laos.

== Operation Left Jab ==
The Central Intelligence Agency (CIA) had trained the first Royalist Lao guerrilla battalions in Military Region 4 (MR 4) of Laos. One of them was selected to undertake MR 4's first battalion-sized operation; they were tasked to temporarily cut Route 110 and clog the logistic network of the Sihanouk Trail leading into Cambodia. A secondary mission was spotting targets for future air strikes. Staging out of Pakse Site 38 on 21 June 1969, 2 SGU Battalion (2 SGU) was helilifted southeastward into the offensive by a mixed fleet of 21st Special Operations Squadron and Air America helicopters. Accompanied by four A-1E Skyraiders for air cover, 2 SGU met no resistance at their landing zone on muddy Route 110. The 350 guerrillas settled in, laying defensive land mines. Only one feasible air target occurred, though, when a communist force of approximately 180 closed in on a Royalist road block. Tactical air strikes scattered that potential counterattack.

== Aftermath ==
After cutting the communist supply lines between Cambodia, Laos and South Vietnam for three days, 2 SGU withdrew in the face of gathering PAVN forces. Their interdiction having diverted communist offensive pressure from the Royalist garrison at Attopeu, 2 SGU now evaded the PAVN and regrouped there on 26 June 1969. The successful Left Jab cleared the way for the Royalists to launch Operation Diamond Arrow.
