= Tchepone Operation =

- Part of Laotian Civil War; Vietnam War
Date	19 October – 13 November 1970
Location	Xépôn; Moung Phine
Result	Unsuccessful Royalist attempt to capture Muong Phalane

Belligerents
Kingdom of Laos; Supported by United States	North Vietnam; Supported by: Soviet Union; People's Republic of China

Units involved
Green Battalion; Red Bravo Battalion; Brown Battalion; Red Battalion; Orange Battalion; Black Battalion; Raven Forward Air Controllers; Royal Lao Air Force; U.S. Air Force; Air America	Group 559

Strength
Battalion-size	~50,000

Casualties and losses
91 killed 178 wounded or missing in action	Heavy

The Tchepone Operation (19 October – 13 November 1970) was an interdiction campaign by the Royal Lao Armed Forces aimed at disrupting the People's Army of Vietnam (PAVN) supply line, the Ho Chi Minh trail. The pair of three-battalion Central Intelligence Agency-sponsored Royalist irregular columns aimed at a communist garrison at Moung Phine, and the vital transshipment point of Tchepone. The Muang Phine thrust was fruitless. The Tchepone column stalled on Route 9 only 13 kilometers from the logistics center on 31 October. Between 1 and 10 November, the PAVN fiercely attacked while reinforced with nine antiaircraft guns and six mortars. The Royalist guerrillas retreated to base under cover of tactical air strikes by the Royal Lao Air Force and U.S. Air Force that inflicted heavy casualties on the PAVN, including close air support delivered within 20 meters of the Royalists. Analysis of the results of the Tchepone Operation convinced the CIA that regimental operations should replace multi-battalion ones.

== Overview ==
Beginning in 1946, France began fighting the communist Viet Minh in French Indochina. The 1954 Geneva Agreements that ended that First Indochina War resulted in a neutral independent Kingdom of Laos. The Agreement specified all foreign military forces had to withdraw from Laos; the only exception was a residual French training mission. However, a North Vietnamese-backed insurrection had settled into northeastern Laos near their home border during the opium harvest season of 1953. After it failed to withdraw, the United States evaded the 1954 Agreement by filling the Programs Evaluation Office with purportedly civilian paramilitary instructors to support the Royal Lao Armed Forces. The Annamese Cordillera in southern Laos became the haven for a communist logistics network, the Ho Chi Minh trail. The communist war effort in South Vietnam depended on that supply route. In 1961, as the Battle of Vientiane upended the Royal Lao Government (RLG), Central Intelligence Agency espionage agent James William Lair designed a paramilitary program to train a guerrilla army of hill tribesmen to defend it.

== Background ==
In Military Region 3 (MR 3) of Laos, the Royalist stronghold at Savannakhet could threaten the Trail. In turn, the People's Army of Vietnam (PAVN) forces guarding the Trail were strong enough to launch serious attacks against the Savannakhet Plains and the Mekong Valley if they wished. However, so long as the RLG maintained a minimal garrison in the Region, they were generally undisturbed. This tacit nonaggression pact between Royalists and Communists lasted with minor exceptions until the Royalist offensive of Operation Duck in March 1969 led to Operation Junction City Jr., followed by Operation Maeng Da. The neighboring CIA Pakse Unit in Military Region 4 also had two active offensive operations attacking the Trail, Operation Honorable Dragon and Operation Diamond Arrow. Deeming these offensives against the Trail promising, the CIA's Savannakhet Unit planned to follow up with another attack called simply the Tchepone Operation. Given that they hired, fired, fed, supplied, and paid their guerrillas personally, they felt them reliable enough for further offensive operations.

== Campaign ==
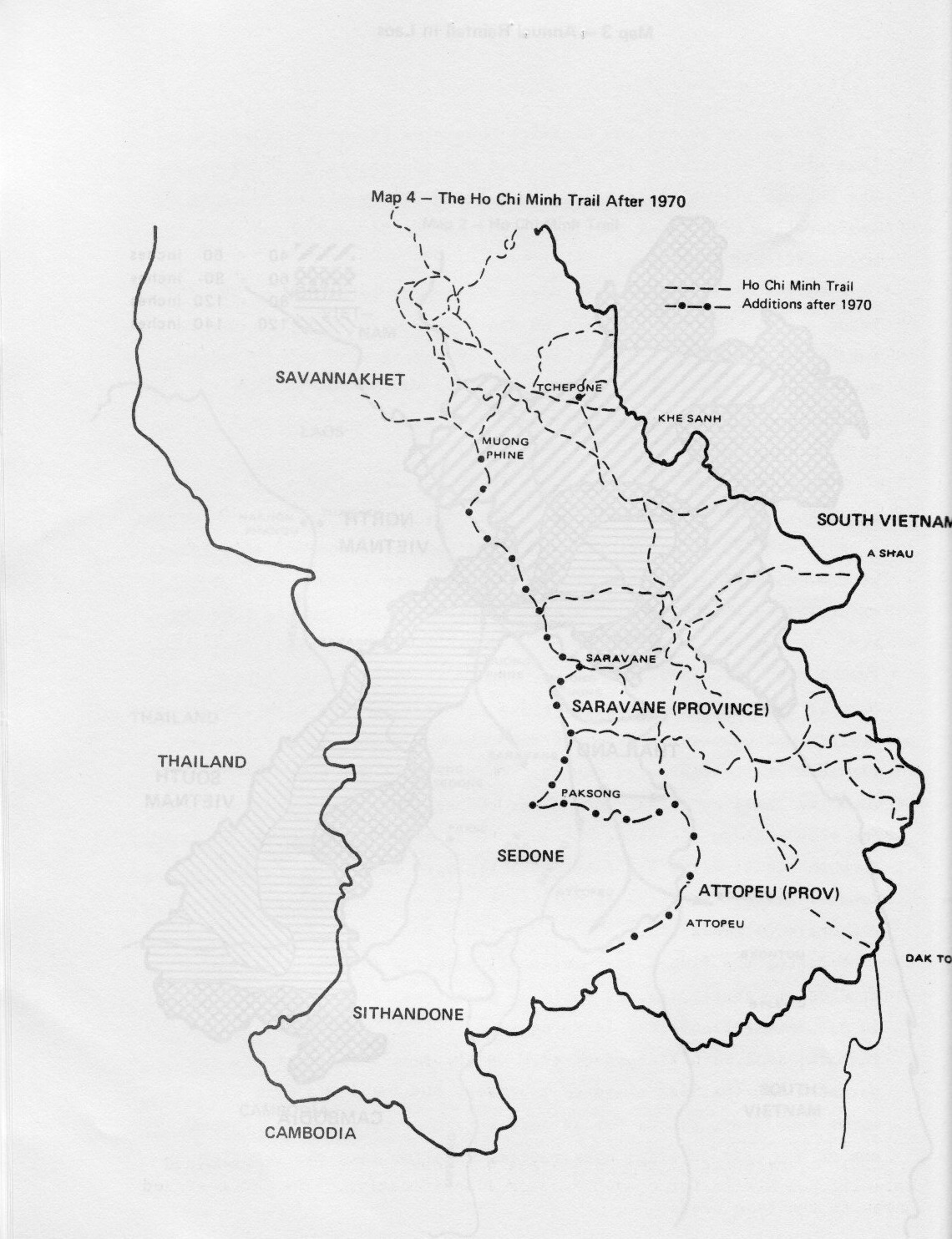
The Ho Chi Minh trail, 1970. Tchepone, the operation's objective, is in the upper third of the map just right of center. The U.S. Khe Sanh Combat Base opposed Tchepone from across the Vietnamese border.

A preliminary sweep of the Se Kong valley rousted its Pathet Lao occupiers and cut supply lines to PAVN troops at Pakse Site 26 on the Bolovens Plateau. The Tchepone Operation that followed was a six battalion foray by CIA trained guerrillas. It began as two columns of three battalions each, departing from a Royalist base at Moung Phalane on 19 October 1970. Green, Brown, and Red Bravo battalions moved southeast under the senior battalion commander's control; their objective was the communist-held village of Moung Phine. The second column aimed Orange, Red, and Black battalions to the east at Tchepone.

Soon after departure, the two columns lost contact with one another. The first column headed toward Moung Phine and lingered on its outskirts, just barely contacting the communist garrison. One CIA case officer claimed the senior battalion commander was distracted by longing for his 17 year old bride. At any rate, Muong Phine remained communist.

The second column did much better. In less than a week, it had penetrated over 50 kilometers toward Tchepone. They crossed Route 23 and bumbled into a hidden communist truck park, complete with repair shops and a headquarters. A surprised small communist garrison slipped away, as the guerrillas torched the complex. Pressing onwards, by 31 October the head of the second column had reached Route 914; Tchepone now lay only 13 kilometers down Route 9. However, on 1 November, a People's Army of Vietnam battalion reinforced by six antiaircraft guns and nine mortars ambushed the rear of the column. Fighting continued throughout the next day; two Raven Forward Air Controllers directed 11 flights of tactical air strikes in close air support, but failed to quell the burgeoning communist forces. By 3 November, additional antiaircraft artillery had moved in, and the situation had become too dangerous for the Royal Lao Air Force's (RLAF) T-28 Trojans. The communist ground fire was so heavy that 39 wounded Royalist troopers could not be medevaced by helicopter.

That night, the Royalist guerrillas managed to disengage somewhat from their attackers. On 4 November, U.S. Air Force (USAF) fighter-bombers flew overhead cover; they also strafed with protective 20mm cannon fire within 20 meters of the Royalists upon occasion. A Forward Air Guide with the partisans reported heavy PAVN casualties, estimated in the hundreds. Two more unsuccessful medevac attempts occurred. By dawn on 5 November, the battle had become a standoff, but incoming mortar fire aborted a fourth medevac attempt. USAF F-4 Phantom IIs then ringed the landing zone with bombs. Finally, the Air America helicopters landed as RLAF T-28s and USAF A-1 Skyraiders simultaneously hit the PAVN force. Freed of their wounded, the Royalists withdrew.

While a rearguard of reconnaissance teams mined Route 9 to within five kilometers of Tchepone, the main body of the Royalist force withdrew into triple canopy jungle. After a famished five days without resupply drops, the Royalists dug and occupied a defensive position atop a bare knoll near Route 23. The PAVN pursuers launched a heedless assault; RLAF and USAF strikes inflicted heavy casualties on them. The position held and the PAVN receded. With the pursuit quashed, in mid-November the Royalist second column resumed its withdrawal from whence it came, Moung Phalane. The first column was ordered northward to aid them; instead it beat the second column back to Moung Phalane. The Tchepone Operation ended on 13 November.

== Aftermath ==
During 16 days of combat, the Royalist forces aimed at Moung Phine had suffered 22 dead but claimed killing 123 communists. The other Royalist column had lost 44 dead and 52 wounded of 322 troops engaged before being withdrawn.

With one battalion written off as ineffective, and two others having fled battle, somehow the Royalists clung to PS 22. In mid-December, they reinforced the site with a RLA battalion that arrived just as the communists launched a three-battalion attack. Despite being subjected to a vicious crossfire, the communists managed to overrun one outpost before withdrawing under heavy tactical air and artillery bombardment. Their casualties were estimated at 200 killed. Royalist casualties were 25 dead, 126 wounded or missing in action.

For lessons learned, the CIA's Savannakhet Unit fired the insubordinate battalion commander. It also decided to try forming a regimental structure to manage multi-battalion operations.
