= Syndicate Sub Rosa =

- Type: Private
- Industry: Branding, Advertising and marketing
- Predecessor: Sub Rosa
- Founded: 2004
- Founder: Michael Ventura
- Key people: Hunter Tura, Tommy Schnoder
- Parent: MTM Companies
- Website: syndicate-subrosa.com

Syndicate Sub Rosa (previously Sub Rosa) is a strategy and empathic design studio based in New York City. The name sub rosa is Latin for "under the rose" referring to conversations being held in secret. Michael Ventura founded the company in 2004. Some of Sub Rosa's most notable work includes the White House's 2016 Every Kid in a Park campaign, brand strategy and website design for Tiger Woods, and campaigns for Pantone.

In 2021, Sub Rosa merged with branding agency Syndicate X to become Syndicate Sub Rosa.

Since 2017, Sub Rosa has been owned by MTM Choice, an independent global network of specialist dynamic brand activation agencies. MTM's founder and CEO, Alexei Orlov, has been accused of discriminatory behavior in previous roles, and was reported by employees to have behaved inappropriately during his business dealings with Syndicate Sub Rosa, including repeated use of a racial slur on a Zoom call with colleagues in 2020.

== History ==
- Michael Ventura founded Sub Rosa in 2004.
- Advertising Age named Sub Rosa the Small Agency of the Year in July 2010.
- The company launched La Petite Mort, a bi-annual creative writing and photography publication featuring works of the company's employees in January 2014.
- In March, 2016 Sub Rosa launched Applied Empathy, a speaker and podcast series.
- In May 2017, Sub Rosa released Questions & Empathy, a deck of cards marketed by the company to "improve empathic thinking."
- In January 2021, Sub Rosa merged with Syndicate X, a global strategic brand consultancy founded by Hunter Tura, to become Syndicate Sub Rosa.

== Notable Projects ==
- In 2021, Syndicate Sub Rosa became Agency-of-Record for Muji North America.
- In 2016, Sub Rosa launched a new corporate brand for Tiger Woods called TGR that serves as an umbrella for his businesses.
- Sub Rosa has been Agency-of-Record for Pantone since 2013, and oversees the company's Color of the Year campaign.
