= 27th Tactical Air Support Squadron =

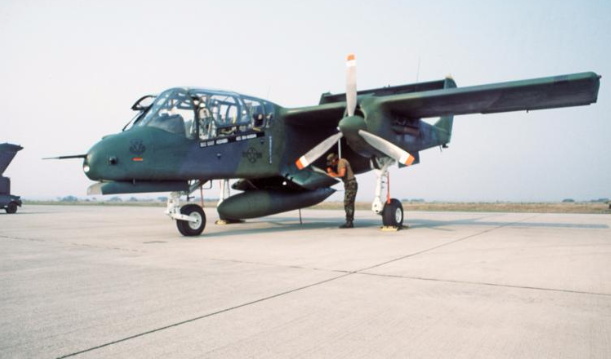
- 27th Tactical Air Support Squadron OV-10 Bronco
- Active: 1942–1944; 1953–1957; 1977–1980; 1984-unknown
- Country: United States
- Branch: United States Air Force
- Role: Airborne forward air control
- Motto(s): Ridemus Dum Servimus Latin Service With a Smile (1953-1957) (Note: Literally, "We Laugh While We Serve.")
- Decorations: Air Force Outstanding Unit Award

Insignia
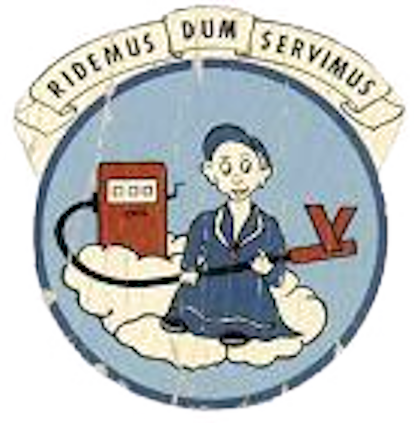
- 27th Air Refueling Squadron emblem

The 27th Tactical Air Support Squadron is an inactive United States Air Force unit. It was last active at George Air Force Base, California, as part of the 602d Tactical Air Control Wing based at Davis-Monthan Air Force Base, Arizona. In 1985, the squadron was consolidated with the World War II-era 27th Ferrying Squadron and the Cold War-era 27th Air Refueling Squadron.

== History ==
=== World War II ===
The 27th Ferrying Squadron was first activated in July 1942 at Presque Isle Army Air Field, Maine, but moved within a week to New Castle Army Air Base, Delaware, where it was assigned to the 2d Ferrying Group. It served primarily to deliver aircraft from manufacturers to operational or training units. However, by 1944 the Army Air Forces was finding that organizations using rigid tables of organization were proving inefficient in performing logistic support and training missions. Accordingly, it adopted a more functional organization in which each base was grouped into a single organization. At the end of March 1944, the 2d Ferrying Group, its squadrons (including the 27th) and all support organizations at New Castle were combined into the 552d Army Air Forces Base Unit, which absorbed their personnel and equipment and continued the ferrying mission.

=== Strategic Air Command ===
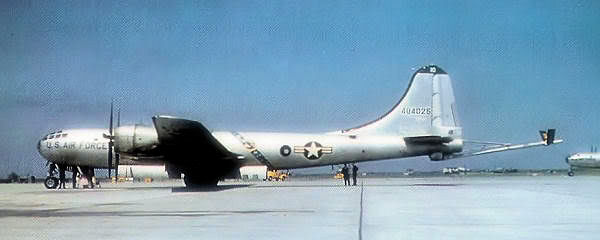
27th Air Refueling Squadron KB-29 (Note: Aircraft is Boeing B-29B-55-BA Superfortress serial 44-84025 at Bergstrom Air Force Base in 1955)

The 27th Air Refueling Squadron was activated at Bergstrom Air Force Base, Texas, in October 1953 and assigned to the 27th Strategic Fighter Wing. The mission of the unit was to provide global refueling for the Strategic Air Command (SAC) 27th and 12th Strategic Fighter Wings at Bergstrom and other USAF units as directed. The unit was inactivated in 1957 shortly after SAC transferred its fighters to Tactical Air Command and a SAC refueling unit was no longer required to support them.

=== Tactical Air Support ===
The 27th Tactical Air Support Squadron was activated at Davis–Monthan Air Force Base, Arizona in July 1977, but inactivated three years later when the 23rd Tactical Air Support Squadron moved from Bergstrom to Davis-Monthan along with the 602d Tactical Air Control Wing and assumed the 27th's mission, personnel and equipment.

It was activated again in May 1984 at George Air Force Base, California. In September 1985, the 27th Air Refueling Squadron and 27th Ferrying Squadron were consolidated with 27th Tactical Air Support Squadron.

== Lineage ==
27th Ferrying Squadron

- Constituted as the 27th Ferrying Squadron on 29 June 1942

Activated on 13 July 1942
Disbanded on 31 March 1944
Reconstituted and consolidated with the 27th Air Refueling Squadron and the 27th Tactical Air Support Squadron as the 27th Tactical Air Support Squadron on 19 September 1985

27th Air Refueling Squadron

- Constituted as the 27th Air Refueling Squadron, Strategic Fighter on 14 September 1953

Activated on 25 October 1953
Inactivated 1 November 1957
Consolidated with the 27th Ferrying Squadron and the 27th Tactical Air Support Squadron as the 27th Tactical Air Support Squadron on 19 September 1985

27th Tactical Air Support Squadron

- Constituted as the 27th Tactical Air Support Squadron on 7 February 1977

Activated on 1 July 1977
Inactivated 1 July 1980
Activated 15 May 1984
Consolidated with the 27th Ferrying Squadron and the 27th Air Refueling Squadron on 19 September 1985
Inactivated after June 1988

== Assignments ==
- Domestic Wing, Air Transport Command, 13 July 1942
- 2d Ferrying Group, 20 July 1942 – 31 March 1944
- 27th Strategic Fighter Wing, 25 October 1953 (attached to 12th Strategic Fighter Wing, 1 April 1955 – 1 September 1955)
- Second Air Force, 1 July – 1 November 1957
- 602d Tactical Air Control Wing, 1 July 1977 – 1 July 1980
- 602d Tactical Air Control Wing, 15 May 1984 – unknown

=== Stations ===
- Presque Isle Army Air Field, Maine, 13 July 1942
- New Castle Army Air Base, Delaware, 20 July 1942 – 31 March 1944
- Bergstrom Air Force Base, Texas, 25 October 1953 – 1 November 1957
- Davis-Monthan Air Force Base, Arizona. 1 July 1977 – 1 July 1980
- George Air Force Base, California, 15 May 1984
- Davis-Monthan Air Force Base, 1989 – unknown

=== Aircraft ===
- Ferried Numerous Aircraft to Overseas Areas 1942–1944
- Boeing KB-29, 1953–1957
- Cessna O-2 Skymaster, 1977–1980
- North American OV-10 Bronco. 1984–unknown

== See also ==
- Air Transport Command
- List of United States Air Force air refueling squadrons
- List of United States Air Force support squadrons
- List of B-29 Superfortress operators
