= Michael Ventura (entrepreneur) =

American author and entrepreneur

- Education: Babson College
- Occupations: Author, entrepreneur, speaker, educator
- Known for: Founder of Sub Rosa; author of Applied Empathy

Michael Ventura is an American author, entrepreneur, and public speaker.

== History ==
Ventura founded the strategy and design studio Syndicate Sub Rosa in New York City in 2004. The firm received national recognition when it was named “Small Agency of the Year” by Ad Age in 2010.

Ventura is also the co-founder of Calliope, a former home and lifestyle shop in New York City, as well as its adjacent gallery, And&And.

Ventura is the author of Applied Empathy: The New Language of Leadership, published by Simon & Schuster in 2018. In a 2018 Forbes article, the publication unpacked Ventura's perspective on empathy as a competitive advantage in business leadership. The book was also included in Inc.com's list of recommended leadership books. Fast Company examined the role of empathy in business in an interview with Ventura, including work conducted by his firm Sub Rosa.

== Bibliography ==
- Applied Empathy: The New Language of Leadership (Simon & Schuster, 2018) ISBN 978-1-5011-8286-0
- Constellation Thinking (Authors Equity, 2027) ISBN 979-8-89331-121-1
