= Operation Diamond Arrow =

- Part of Laotian Civil War; Vietnam War
Date	20 September 1969 – 9 March 1970
Location	Southern Laos, near the Ho Chi Minh Trail
Result	Royalists withstand communist siege to hold Thatheng

Belligerents
Kingdom of Laos	North Vietnam

Units involved
Bataillon Volontaires 46; Bataillon Infanterie 7 U.S. Air Force; Royal Lao Air Force; Raven Forward Air Controllers; Nail Forward Air Controllers	Three infantry battalions from Group 968

Strength
Battalion-size	Battalion-size

Casualties and losses
40 killed 100 wounded 30 missing	Estimated 500

Operation Diamond Arrow was a battle in southern Laos, waged from 20 September 1969 through 9 March 1970. The struggle centered on a Royal Lao Army stronghold at the strategic road intersection of Routes 16 and 23. Due to intervention by U.S. and Lao tactical air strikes, and an air bridge supply effort, the Royal Lao Army troops survived besiegement in a fixed defensive position, only to abandon their position post-battle.

== Overview ==
Located in the southern panhandle of the territory of the Kingdom of Laos, the Ho Chi Minh Trail was the logistics backbone of the communist forces during the Second Indochina War, as it was the main supply route for Viet Cong and People's Army of Vietnam (PAVN) forces fighting in South Vietnam. During 1969, there were a number of military operations waged against the Trail in southern Laos, including Operation Maeng Da, Operation Honorable Dragon, and Operation Junction City Jr., that originated in Laos. Road intersections, such as the junction of Lao Routes 16 and 23 (since renumbered as Route 20), were prime objectives for both sides.

== Operation ==
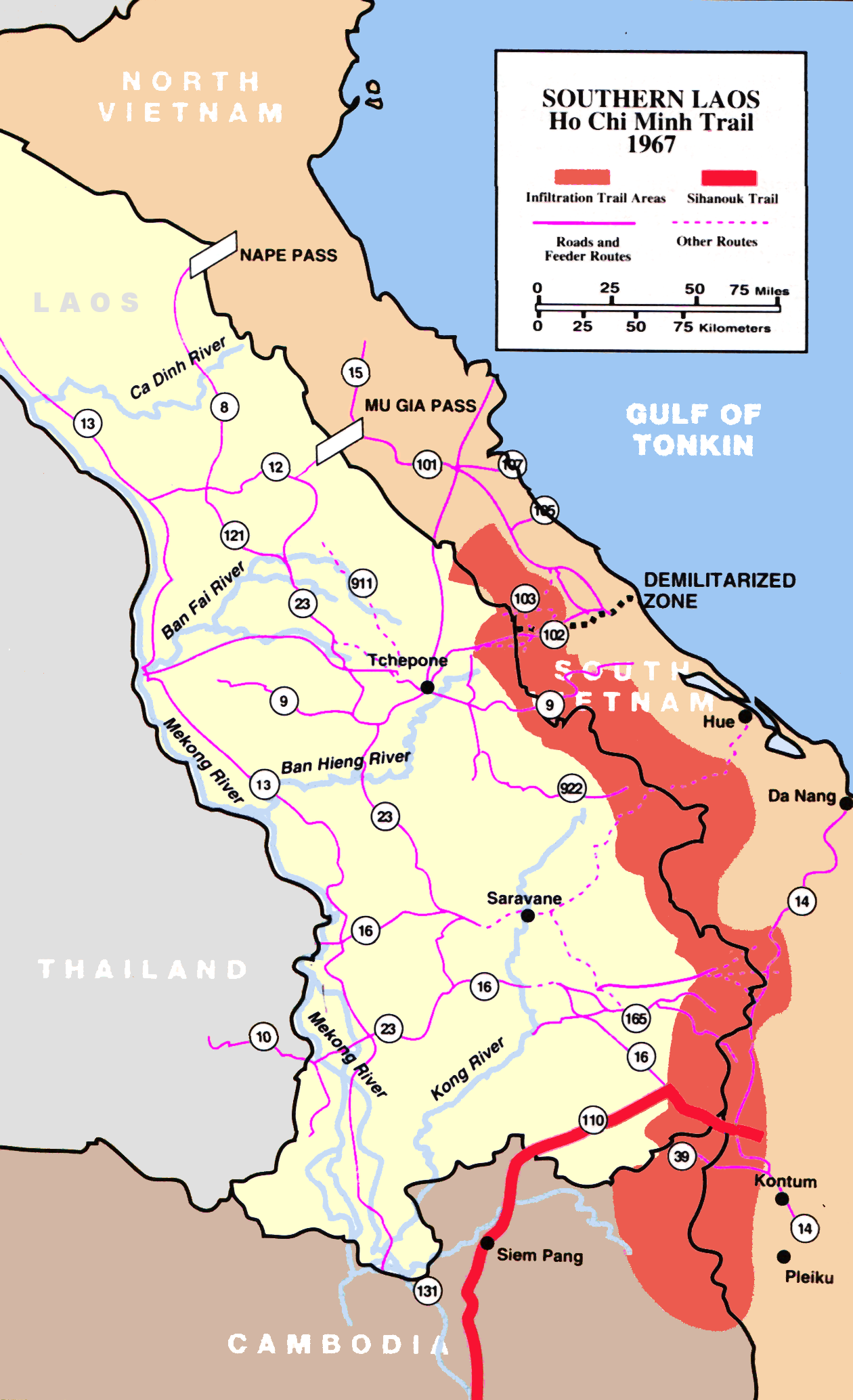
Map of Southern Laos and the Ho Chi Minh Trail network.

Operation Diamond Arrow was focused on Thatheng, where Routes 16 and 23 merged in an intersection to form Route 16/23. Surrounding mountainous terrain funneled traffic through this line of communication to the Bolovens Plateau. Occupation of the intersection was crucial to controlling the Plateau overlooking the Ho Chi Minh Trail. Some Royal Lao Army officers believed road closure by communist forces would lead to the Royal Lao Government's loss of the Bolovens Plateau.

In April 1969, a Royal Lao Army garrison abandoned Thateng to the enemy without any resistance. To counter the communist occupation of the town, Royalist troops were airlifted to a hilltop position overlooking the town and road intersection. On 20 September, a force of four Royalist companies of regulars and three of guerrillas launched Operation Diamond Arrow from Salavane, north of Thateng. Meeting only scattered opposition, this force reached Ban Toumlan on 8 October.

On 27 November 1969, PAVN Group 968 attacked Thatheng. The Royalist defenders held out until 13 December when it was attacked by three PAVN infantry battalions. The town fell to the PAVN, but the Royalist Bataillon Volontaires 46 (Volunteer Battalion 46) hung on in an adjacent stronghold despite casualties of about 40 killed, 100 wounded, and 30 missing. While the Royalists sheltered within the French-built fort, the communists blasted away land mines and defensive barbed wire to clear paths for frontal assaults by their infantry. By day, Raven Forward Air Controllers directed close air support against the PAVN. An AC-130 Spectre gunship was sent to their relief, in its first-ever appearance supporting Lao troops in contact. For the next four nights, the gunship would strafe the town with a copious volume of minigun and 20mm cannon fire. Nail FACs from Nakhon Phanom Royal Thai Air Force Base flew night reconnaissance. Royal Lao Air Force AT-28s blasted most of the town flat, sparing only the pagoda. Group 968 suffered an estimated 240 killed by air strikes. Total PAVN losses to air attacks were estimated at 500. At this juncture, the besieged BV 46 had become wholly dependent on air power to defend their fixed position.

Simultaneously, Royalist guerrillas blocked the road to Attopeu to prevent communist reinforcement. On 19 December, Group 968 withdrew and Bataillon Volontaires 46 retook the ruined town. From their new position, the PAVN shelled the airfield, rendering it unusable to the Royalists. An abortive PAVN ground assault followed. By 28 December, there was a lull in combat. At this point, a massive U.S. air campaign began to encircle the besieged battalion with air strikes. The PAVN still mortared the airfield, however, air drops adequately supplied the besieged garrison.

The siege continued through January 1970. On the night of 1 February, the PAVN mortared the fort's defensive perimeter, then launched a human wave assault that overwhelmed Royalist defenses and almost overran the fort. By 2 February, BV 46 had dwindled to 250 men, and was exhausted to the point of desertion. With the besieged Royalists unwilling or unable to appear outside walls to repair the perimeter defenses destroyed in the human wave attack, the barbed wire was replenished via air sowing from C-123s. Air drop specialists cut the binding on rolls of wire being flung into the aircraft's slipstream so the wire would unreel; although dropped in irregular patterns, its coils proved suitably obstructive when seeded with aerial area denial ordnance.

However, by 5 February, the PAVN had infiltrated the ruined town; they set up an 82mm mortar in a hut, firing shells out through the thatch roof. A Raven FAC spotted it and called in an F-100 Super Sabre strike to destroy it. The following day, more mines were dropped by F-4 Phantom IIs in a horseshoe bend around the Royalists, limiting the battlefield to a single avenue of attack or retreat. More aerial mining followed on 7 and 8 February. As the PAVN removed defensive obstacles, they were replaced from the air, blunting their assaults. U.S. forward air controllers became expert at spotting the muzzle flashes of communist mortars, and having them demolished by air strikes making the Vietnamese gunners very circumspect.

On 11 February 1970, MR 4's premier unit, Bataillon Infanterie 7 (Infantry Battalion 7), was helicoptered into a mountaintop position three kilometers southwest of Thatheng. From there, they could lay down suppressive fire from mortars and recoilless rifles. With this covering fire, the airfield below could be used to ship in supplies and remove casualties. On 6 March, the aerial area denial program was ended. The PAVN would make one last halfhearted unsuccessful attempt at an attack on 9 March before leaving the battlefield to the victorious Royalists.

With a gunship flying nightly cover guarding against renewed communist attacks, BV 46 hung onto the Thateng intersection until 4 April. Then it deserted en masse despite being adequately supplied and under no threat of attack. BI 7 clung to its nearby hilltop position for almost another month before abandoning the battlefield and walking back to its base at Pakse.
