= Operation Junction City Jr. =

- Part of Laotian Civil War; Vietnam War
Date	28 July – 17 October 1969
Location	Muong Phine; the Route 9/23 junction; Tchepone
Result	No lasting change in territory. Royalist incursion starves PAVN division into retreat

Belligerents
Kingdom of Laos	North Vietnam

Units involved
Red Battalion; Green Battalion; White Battalion; Batallon Commando 203; Yellow Battalion; Blue Battalion; 20th Special Operations Squadron; Air America; Royal Lao Air Force; U.S. Air Force; Raven Forward Air Controllers; Nail Forward Air Controllers	Six battalions with antiaircraft guns Backed by Group 559

Strength
Battalion-size	Battalion-size; Backed by ~50,000

Casualties and losses
Unknown	Est. 500 KIA

Operation Junction City Jr. was a major Laotian offensive of the Vietnam War; initially aimed at temporary disruption of the Ho Chi Minh Trail, it was extended into an attempt to isolate the major North Vietnamese communist transshipment point at Tchepone from the units it was supposed to supply.

After an initial blooding from 23 to 27 March 1969 during Operation Duck, three Royal Lao Army irregular battalions trained by the Central Intelligence Agency (CIA) were launched on Operation Junction City Jr. On 28 July 1969, a Royalist force occupied the airfield at Vang Tai, to begin the offensive. Moving out in August under tactical air cover directed by Raven FACs and Nail FACs, elements of the Royalist force captured the Route 9/23 road junction near Pathet Lao-held Moung Phine on 4 September. After capturing Moung Phine, the Royalists extended the campaign in an attempt to neutralize Tchepone during September, foreshadowing the future Operation Lam Son 719. By 17 October 1969, Operation Junction City Jr. had been pushed back to its point of departure; however, it had destroyed supplies sufficient to have kept a communist division in the field.

== Overview ==
After World War II, France fought the First Indochina War to retain French Indochina. Following the French defeat at Dien Ben Phu and the subsequent 1954 Geneva Agreements a neutral Laos gained its independence. When France withdrew most of its military in conformity with the treaty, the United States filled the vacuum with purportedly civilian paramilitary instructors. A North Vietnamese-backed communist insurrection began as early as 1949. Invading during the opium harvest season of 1953, it settled in northeastern Laos adjacent to the border of the Democratic Republic of Vietnam.

As the Laotian Civil War flared from 1961 onward, the CIA carried out a paramilitary program designed to foster a guerrilla army to support the Royal Lao Government (RLG). Paralleling that, the U.S. Department of Defense covertly supported the Royal Lao Army and other Lao armed forces through a sub rosa supply system, as the U.S. picked up the entire budget of Laos. The Annamese Cordillera in southern Laos became the haven for a communist logistics network, the Ho Chi Minh Trail. The communist war effort in South Vietnam depended on that supply route.

In Military Region 3 (MR 3) of Laos a tacit nonaggression pact existed between Royalists and Communists. The Royalist stronghold at Savannakhet could threaten the Trail. In turn, the People's Army of Vietnam (PAVN) forces guarding the Trail were strong enough to launch serious attacks against the Savannakhet Plains and the Mekong Valley if they wished. However, so long as the RLG maintained a minimal garrison, they were generally undisturbed. Then the CIA launched Operation Junction City Jr.

== Preliminary action ==
The CIA paramilitary agents in MR 3 were unique in the Laotian Civil War in the direct control they were allowed to exert on their irregular operations. In early 1969, MR 3 hosted three Royalist guerrilla battalions newly trained by the CIA at its Savannakhet base. On 23 March, two of Red Battalion's companies, with 115 men apiece, were tasked with the Operation Duck raid on an enemy complex housed in a cave southeast of Mahaxay. The purpose of the raid was to destroy the complex while gathering enemy documents for military intelligence analysis. Helilifted in by the 20th Special Operations Squadron (20th SOS) and Air America under air cover of U.S. Air Force (USAF) tactical fighter strikes, the guerrillas were heavily engaged by the PAVN. Four times the communist headquarters was struck by U.S. Air Force jets depositing napalm, cluster bomb units, and 2,000 pound bombs. After suffering four killed, and having killed 40 of their foe, the raiders noted an incoming thunderstorm that would halt air strikes and fled southwards. On 26 March, eight CH-3E helicopters of the 20th SOS began evacuating the Red Battalion troops. They removed 70, but received battle damage from heavy ground fire to five helicopters, and aborted the mission. The remaining Royalist troops evaded the communists and moved to Route 122 to be removed on 27 March. Despite these disappointing results, the new guerrilla force was deemed ready for further action.

== Operation Junction City Jr. ==
On 28 July 1969, one company of Red Battalion was helicoptered in to Tang Vai on Route 111 and seized the airfield there with no opposition. As Tang Vai lay 31 kilometers from friendly forces, on the edge of the Ho Chi Minh Trail, the lack of opposition was surprising. The next day, a battalion of the Royal Lao Army was flown in. On 2 August, Green Battalion was also helilifted in, they moved out east under an umbrella of air support from both the USAF and the Royal Lao Air Force (RLAF). When they struck Route 111, Red Battalion headed northeast toward the communist positions at Muong Phine. Green Battalion moved southwards, then turned to the east. Arrangements were made for RLAF T-28s and U.S. Air Force A-1E Skyraiders to fly air cover for the Royalist forces, amassing only 200 sorties in the month between 28 July and 28 August.

On 28 August, the offensive operation was extended, with the aim of occupying Moung Phine for a week and blocking the intersection of Routes 9 and 23 nine kilometers west of the town. As Moung Phine was the only Pathet Lao-held town in the Laotian panhandle, and served as a communist sanctuary, it was a prime target because it had been off limits to air strikes. The renewed operation was facetiously dubbed Junction City Jr. after both the 1967 operation in South Vietnam and the road junction objective.

White Battalion was now lifted into Vang Tai. While it marched east to join Green battalion, Bataillon Commando 203 (BC 203) was airlifted in by RLAF Sikorsky H-34s to secure Vang Tai and its airstrip while White and Green Battalions moved toward the road intersection. As of 1 September 1969, air support was limited to 12 A-1 sorties daily, supported by a flareship by night and two forward air controllers (FACs) by day. On 2 September, Red Battalion was halted when it took 17 casualties in a brief clash with the communists. That same day, Green and White Battalions were halted by high water in the Se Thamouak River. Forcing a crossing two days later, they peacefully occupied the 9/23 intersection. On 6 September, Red Battalion joined them. At this point, the Rules of Engagement were changed to allow air strikes on Moung Phine.

USAF fighter-bombers seeded all routes into Moung Phine with Mk-36 area denial ordnance to block traffic—Routes 9, 23, and the combined 9/23. Early on 7 September, four USAF A-1E Skyraiders bombed the town; that afternoon, four more repeated the attack. That evening, the Royalist irregulars took Moung Phine. They captured 45 Pathet Lao soldiers, freed 165 detained Lao citizens from various jails and another 2,000 villagers from porterage. A cache of 2,000 small arms and copious documentation were also captured. In all, 2,000 tons of supplies were captured, and 1,500 villagers evacuated to government territory.

At this point, there was a controversy over whether to spray herbicide on standing rice crops around Moung Phine to deny them to the communists. Given the increasing communist antiaircraft weaponry opposing them, the need for rice to feed local populace, and fear of communist counterattacks in reprisal, only ten percent of the crops were sprayed.

Based on success to date, the decision was made to once again extend the offensive. The objective now became cutting the Ho Chi Minh Trail near the transshipment point of Tchepone. Tchepone was garrisoned by six PAVN battalions defended by antiaircraft guns. Air support for the government forces would come from the numerous tactical air sorties already directed at the Trail, and would be directed by Nail FACs and Raven FACs. Although the Royalists realized that capturing the actual town was unlikely, they planned to occupy another road junction, Routes 9/91 ten kilometers northwest of Tchepone. They also planned to cut Route 9 between Tchepone and Vietnam, stranding the North Vietnamese garrison. However, they paused to refresh and realign their forces.

On 13 September 1969, BC 203 moved forward to garrison Moung Phine. On 17 September, White Battalion was withdrawn from the operation, to be replaced by Yellow Battalion. By 23 September, Yellow Battalion occupied a mountaintop position overlooking Moung Phine. Green and Red Battalions were then withdrawn by 28 September. On 29 September, Blue Battalion replaced them.

Blue Battalion marched toward the 9/91 intersection and occupied the intermediate junction of Routes 9/914, five kilometers short of 9/91. A PAVN counterattack pushed Blue Battalion southwestward into defensive positions on a nearby mountain.

On 4 October, an approaching crowd of refugees was mistaken for PAVN by BC 203; the Royalist regulars fled to Moung Phalan. Nearby Yellow Battalion followed suit, abandoning its hilltop stronghold. Early on 6 October, not knowing Moung Phine had been abandoned, a company from Red Battalion was airlifted into an ambush on the airstrip. Two 20th SOS helicopters were downed on the runway, stranding eight USAF fliers and 44 Lao troops. Scavenging four M60 machine guns from the crashed helicopters to beef up their defense, the fliers and the Red Battalion soldiers held off the PAVN all day. After being reduced to using sidearms for defense, the surrounded detachment was rescued at 18:30 by two helicopters swooping in under cover of an airdropped tear gas barrage.

Green, White, and Blue Battalions staged an eastward assault from Muong Phalane toward Moung Phine, while Red Battalion moved toward the 9/914 junction. By 17 October, the three battalion attack force had stalled six kilometers shy of the 9/23 intersection. Lacking both an overall operational commander to coordinate maneuvers, as well as support from CIA handlers distracted by Kou Kiet, the operation was terminated. The communists had regained all their lost ground.

== Results ==
Operation Junction City Jr. was credited with depriving an entire PAVN division of supplies, causing its withdrawal from the field. Besides the captured materiel, the operation was credited with killing an estimated 500 enemy troops. A total of 6,000 potential porters were eventually evacuated. Besides diverting manpower and supplies from North Vietnamese operations to engage the Lao forces, the PAVN was forced to extend its defensive perimeter further west from the Ho Chi Minh Trail and occupy more of the Lao panhandle.

The Royalist forces held the line through January 1970. A battered Brown Battalion returned from operations in Military Region 2 and was assigned as security guards at Prince Boun Oum's personal tin mine. Two newly raised battalions did not join the Royalist front line formations, which became static.

Encouraged by Junction City Jr.'s results, the CIA planned the Tchepone Operation.
