= Sub Rosa (band) =

Rock group from Brazil

Sub Rosa is a Brazilian rock band that was formed in 2006. The band's members were influenced by progressive rock and classic rock. Sub Rosa's debut album, "The Gigsaw (2009)", was an independent release. Due to strong sales in Europe and the United States, the album was re-released in Brazil by the label "Progressive Rock Worldwide / Megahard Records", in a remixed and remastered deluxe digipack version, with three bonus tracks and a new artwork. On 11 November 2021, the band released its second album, 11:11, in a double-CD set, once again by the label "Progressive Rock Worldwide".

== History ==
Sub Rosa was originally formed by Reinaldo José, Vinicius Mendes, and Daniel Deboni in 2006; however, the trio never recorded a song together. Thereafter, they established what became a stable line-up of Reinaldo José (bass and vocals), Vinicius Mendes (guitar, keyboard and vocals), Junior Mansur (keyboard, guitar, and vocals), and Romulo Cesar (drums and vocals). This line-up recorded a demo CD in 2007, with the songs "Enslavement of Beauty," "Waiting for the Sun," and "Desvendando Mistérios,"

In 2008, Sub Rosa disbanded during the first recording sessions of their debut album and Reinaldo José produced the album by himself. Soon, Marcia Cristina and Glaydston Friederich (both singers) became official band members and the album was recorded with the help of some special guests.

"The Gigsaw" was released in December 2009. The band's first show took place in the "Ady Rosa de Freitas" theatre, with a new line-up: Reinaldo José (bass and vocals), Bárbara Laranjeira (drums and vocals), Márcia Cristina (vocals), Glaydston Friederich (vocals), Al Duarte (keyboard and vocals), Thiago Gil (guitar), and the special guest Daniel Laranjeira (violin).

In 2010, Sub Rosa became the winner of the "I Festival de Música Independente" (I Independent Music Festival) of the WULP Radio with the song "Equinox". The publicity from the festival piqued overseas distributors' interest in "The Gigsaw", and the increase in sales allowed the band to undertake the "USA East Coast Tour", with six shows in Miami, Fort Lauderdale, Pittsburgh, Newark, New York City, and Boston. The band covered four states in 18 days of October 2011.

In 2014, despite selling more than 14,000 CDs in the US, Asia, and Europe, Sub Rosa was not yet recognized in Brazil. The label "Progressive Rock Worldwide/Megahard Records" released "The Gigsaw" in a remixed, remastered deluxe digipack version, with three bonus tracks and new artwork. Meanwhile, the band recorded its second album, a double CD called "11:11", released on 11 November 2021.

Sub Rosa's current line-up consists of: Reinaldo José (bass and vocals), Bárbara Laranjeira (drums, keyboards and vocals), Rômulo César (drums, guitars, keyboards and vocals), Rudolf Pinto (guitar) and Antônio "ToSan" Ribeiro (keyboard).

== Oddities ==
The main themes of the band are philosophy, psychology, traditional mysticism, mythology, and references to occultism. The bandleader, José, is the venerable master of a masonic lodge, called Ars Regia Therion. In several photos, he is linked in some way to the rockroses, AMORC, and other orders. Sub Rosa works in a studio called "To Mega Therion", one of the magic names of Aleister Crowley, a famed British occultist.

In an interview available on the website Whiplash!, they paint the idea that the album "The Gigsaw" is some kind of an enigma––a mathematical, symbolical jigsaw where the songs, the lyrics, the artwork, and every element of the work is nuanced, and there to be intensely studied.

Although the band allowed their songs to be downloaded freely in all countries, they mainly achieved success overseas, and are yet to be popular in their native Brazil.

== Discography ==
- 2007 – "Sub Rosa" (demo CD)
- 2009 – "The Gigsaw" (official album)
- 2015 – "The Gigsaw" – deluxe version (official album – Progressive rock Worldwide)
- 2021 – "11:11" – (official album – double CD set – Progressive rock Worldwide)

== Videography ==
- 2012 – "The Live Gigsaw – Ao Vivo no Camping Rock" (Official DVD)
