= Agency of record =

Agency authorized to purchase advertising

An agency of record (AOR) in advertising and marketing is an agency that is authorized to purchase advertising (such as radio, television advertising or online advertising) on behalf of the company with which they have an agency contract.
