= Operation Maeng Da =

- Part of Laotian Civil War; Vietnam War
Date	2 – 17 July 1970
Location	Tchepone, southern Laotian panhandle
Result	Unsuccessful Royalist attempt to disrupt the Ho Chi Minh Trail

Belligerents
Kingdom of Laos; Supported by United States	North Vietnam; Supported by: Soviet Union; People's Republic of China

Units involved
Blue Battalion; Black Battalion; Mobile 1	9th PAVN Battalion backed by Group 559

Strength
Blue Battalion = 300; Black Battalion = 300; Mobile 1 = 550	Unknown regimental strength backed by ~50,000

Casualties and losses
Black Battalion = heavy Other battalions unknown	Unknown

Operation Maeng Da was a Royal Lao Government military offensive aimed at disrupting the crucial communist supply route of the Second Indochina War, the Ho Chi Minh trail. Launched from a rendezvous point near Vang Tai, Laos, on 2 July 1970 as a three-battalion assault on the major People's Army of Vietnam (PAVN) transshipment center at Tchepone, Laos, it ran into stiff resistance from the PAVN 9th Regiment from 11–15 July. An attempt on 16 July to reinforce the Royalist Blue, Black, and Mobile 1 battalions by White Battalion was thwarted by PAVN ground fire and hazardously heavy air traffic over the battlefield. On 17 July, the worst hit Royalist unit, Black Battalion, was airlifted back out of battle. The other two Royalist battalions exfiltrated away from the PAVN troops. In the process, the commander of Mobile 1 was killed; the battalion lost all combat discipline. Both retreating battalions regrouped at the operation's start point. Although ancillary follow-up operations occurred in the vicinity throughout September, the Maeng Da offensive would not resume. However, the Central Intelligence Agency, which had trained and supported the Royalist guerrilla battalions, prepared the Tchepone Operation to follow it.

== Overview ==
After World War II, France fought the First Indochina War to retain French Indochina. As part of its loss of that war at Dien Ben Phu, it freed the Kingdom of Laos. Laotian neutrality was established in the 1954 Geneva Agreements. When France withdrew most of its military in conformity with the treaty, the United States filled the vacuum with purportedly civilian paramilitary instructors. A North Vietnamese-backed communist insurrection had begun as early as 1949. Invading during the opium harvest season of 1953, a North Vietnamese communist force settled in northeastern Laos adjacent to the border of the Democratic Republic of Vietnam.

As the Laotian Civil War flared from 1961 onward, the Central Intelligence Agency (CIA) carried out a paramilitary program designed to foster a guerrilla army to support the Royal Lao Government (RLG) in northern Laos. Paralleling that, the U.S. Department of Defense covertly supported the regular Royal Lao Army and other Lao armed forces through a sub rosa supply system, as the U.S. picked up the entire budget of the Kingdom of Laos. Meanwhile, the Annamese Cordillera in southern Laos became the haven for a logistics network, the Ho Chi Minh trail. The communist war effort in South Vietnam depended on that supply route.

== Background ==
Previous military operations had been launched from the Kingdom of Laos against the Trail during 1969 and 1970. Operation Maeng Da was another of those operations designed to influence the course of the Vietnam War by attacking the crucial North Vietnamese communist supply line. It also served as a test of the Central Intelligence Agency-sponsored Mobile 1 battalion that had been raised for service beyond its parent Military Region 3 (MR 3). Mobile 1 was a new battalion of 550 men. Battalions raised for service within MR3 consisted of 300 soldiers. Other Military Regions in Laos had felt cheated by being reinforced with the understrength battalions. In response, the CIA had reluctantly trained Mobile 1. The CIA trainers were contemptuous of their urban recruits; their disdain was reflected by the fact that a Lao slang meaning of the term "maeng da" is "pimp".

== The operation ==
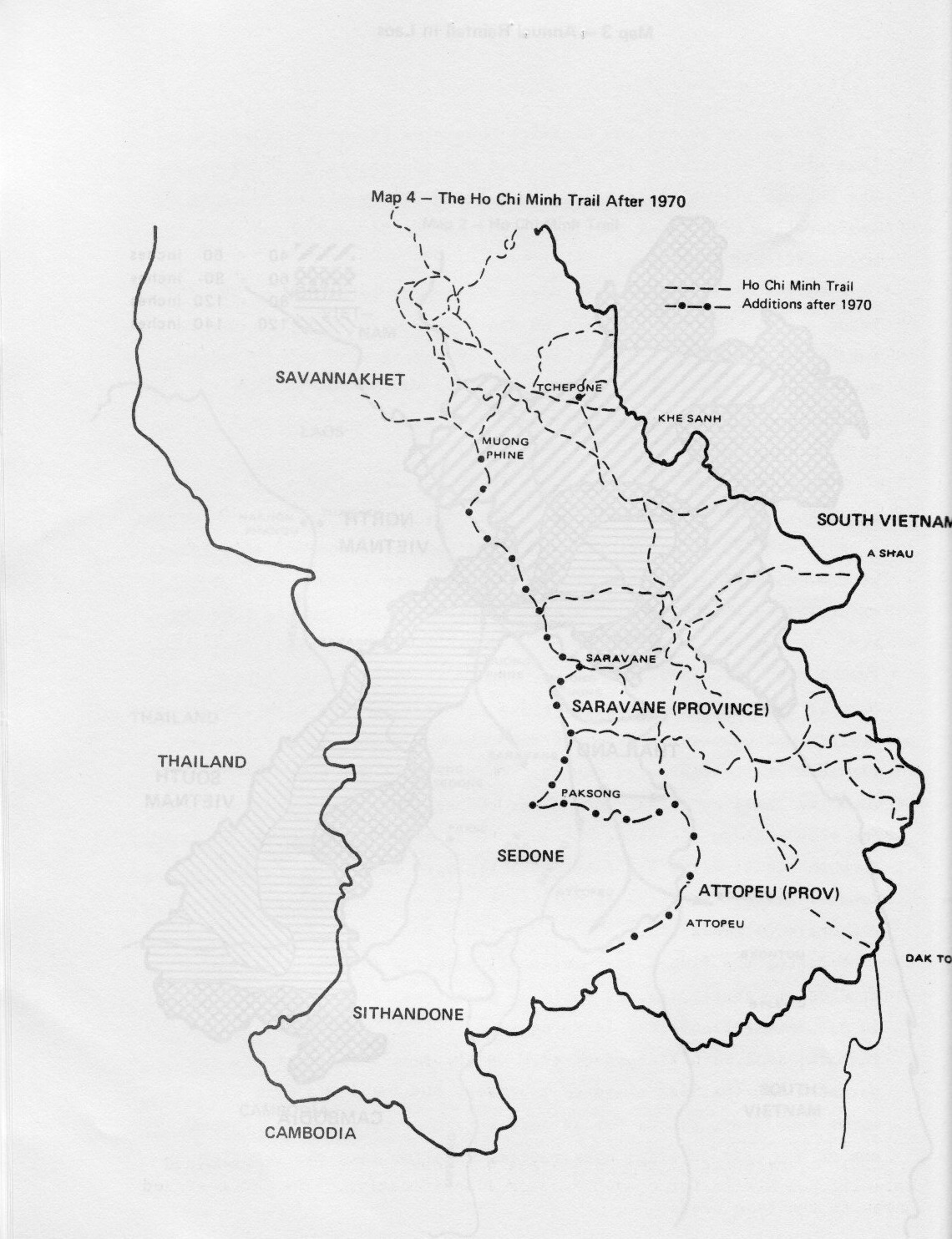
The Ho Chi Minh Trail, 1970. Tchepone, Operation Maeng Da's objective, is in the upper third of the map just right of center. The U.S. Khe Sanh Combat Base opposed Tchepone from across the Vietnamese border.

The objective of Operation Maeng Da was the vital communist transshipment point at Tchepone. Mobile 1 was not alone on this multi-battalion mission, the first in MR 3 to be launched under a single field commander. It was inserted by helicopter at a rendezvous point near Vang Tai on 2 July 1970. Black Battalion joined it from the west; Blue Battalion came from the north. The three battalions came together at Vang Tai on 8 July. From there they moved southeast, reaching Route 23 on 10 July, finding little communist activity. They expected White Battalion to land 10 kilometers distant from them as the initial reinforcements for the march on Tchepone. Instead, they spent 11–15 July heavily engaged with People's Army of Vietnam 9th Regiment regulars, with Black Battalion taking severe casualties. On 16 July, the three Royalist irregular battalions withdrew to a helicopter landing zone slated for White Battalion's arrival. However, the fighting was too heavy to land the reinforcing White Battalion. The hurly-burly of tactical aircraft supporting the landed troops made the air space surrounding the HLZ exceedingly hazardous. The CIA agent controlling the insertion aborted it.

On 17 July, three flights of U.S. Air Force Douglas A-1 Skyraiders struck in support of Black Battalion. They were followed by Royal Lao Air Force AT-28 strikes delivered within 50 meters of friendly forces. Then the flying weather went bad and tactical air could not support an insertion of White Battalion.

The American Embassy planning team for the Laotian Civil War met in the embassy in Vientiane on the afternoon of 17 July. When the air attaché briefed the meeting on the progress of Maeng Da, the CIA Station chief was humiliated to discover he had not been previously informed of the attack. He furiously reminded his subordinates that his MR 3 staff was supposed to seek approval from him for any multi-battalion operations. After threatening to relieve anyone and everyone responsible for Maeng Da, he cancelled the scheduled insertion of White Battalion. Instead, on the following day, Black Battalion was helilifted back out of combat. The other two battalions began to recede toward Vang Tai. Mobile 1's commander was killed by communist fire; then the battalion lost all unit cohesion. The Maeng Da stragglers reached Vang Tai on 26 July.

== Aftermath ==
Although Maeng Da had ended, military activity in the vicinity did not. South of Maeng Da, Orange and Green Battalions moved southward into Military Region 4. This move was supported by a melange of forward air controllers of the 23d Tactical Air Support Squadron and the Ravens, as well as Laotian forward air guides. On 3 September 1970, they occupied Ban Houei Mun, which was stocked as a forward airstrip for the Raven FACs. Beginning 9 September, the two battalions pushed 28 kilometers southeastward into low ground west of Tuomlane. Black Battalion joined them there. Meanwhile, White Battalion, joined by Mobile 2, spent 4–7 September 1970 combing the nearby Route 23 valley.

== Results ==
The assault on the Ho Chi Minh Trail choked up supply traffic while it lasted; to the Americans, that was a success. As the operation ground to an end, the CIA's Savannakhet Unit was poised with a larger follow-up operation to drive on to Tchepone with the Tchepone Operation.
