= 23rd Flying Training Squadron =

23d Flying Training Squadron
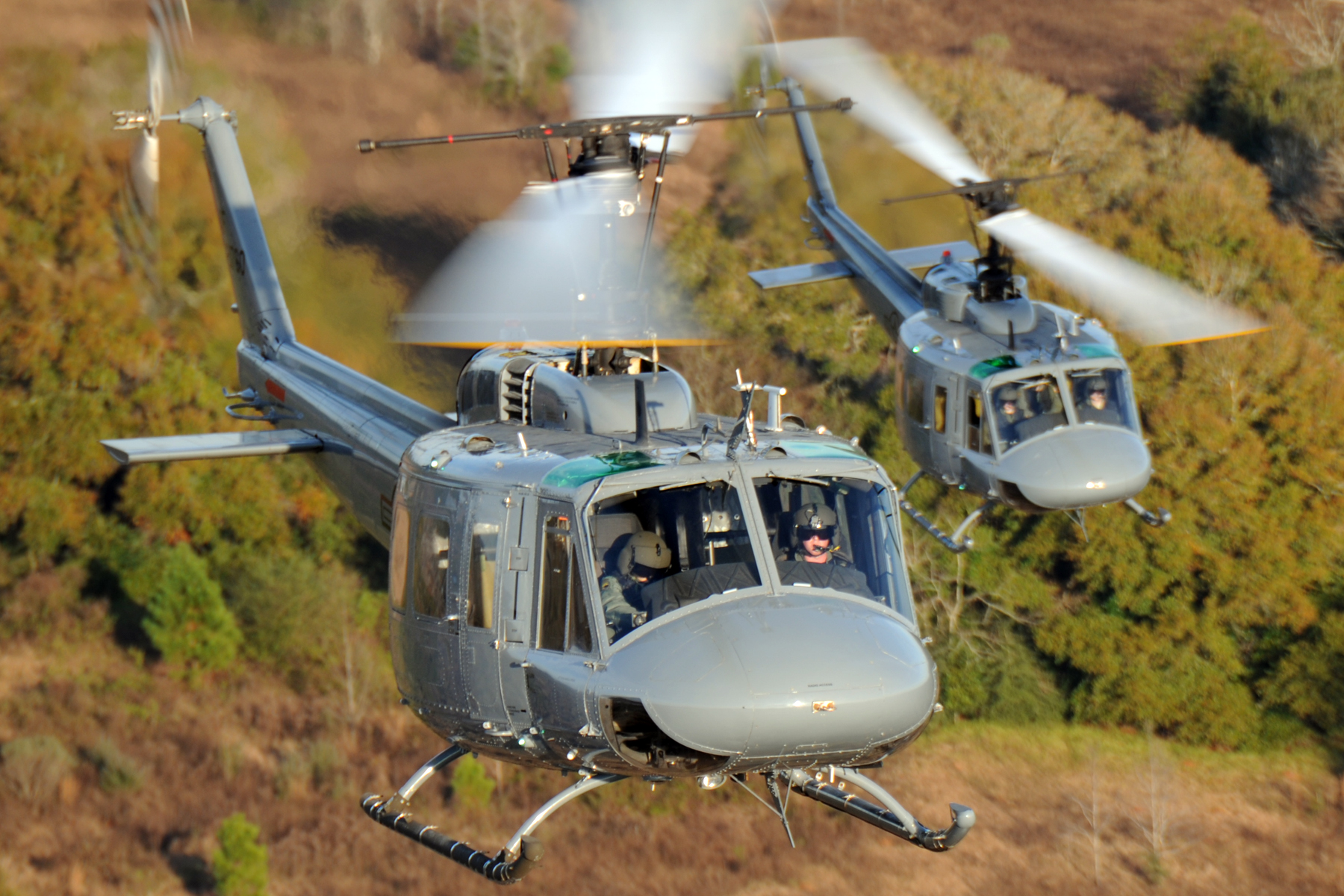
- Squadron student pilots practice landing TH-1H helicopters during formation-flight patterns
- Active: 1941–1944; 1944–1946; 1956–1958; 1966–1975; 1975–1991; 1994–present
- Country: United States
- Branch: United States Air Force
- Role: Flying Training
- Part of: Air Education and Training Command
- Engagements: American Theater Antisubmarine Campaign; Vietnam War; Desert Storm
- Decorations: Presidential Unit Citation; Air Force Outstanding Unit Award with Combat "V" Device; Air Force Outstanding Unit Award; Republic of Vietnam Gallantry Cross with Palm

Insignia
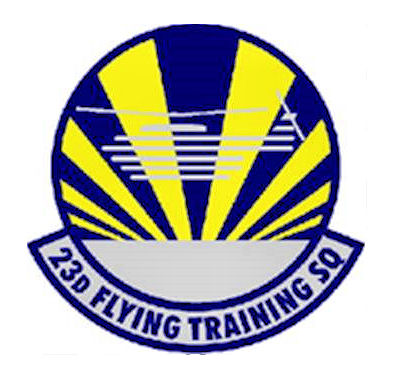
- 23d Flying Training Squadron emblem (approved 15 November 1994)

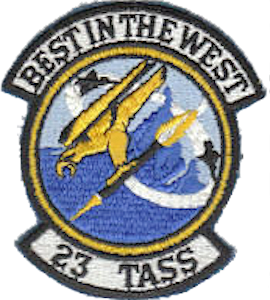
- Patch with 23d Tactical Air Support Squadron emblem (TAC era)

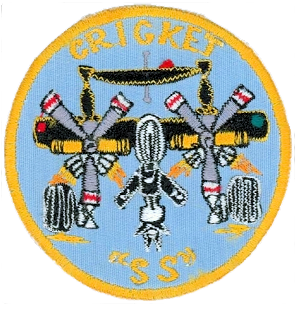
- 23d Tactical Air Support Squadron patch (PACAF era)

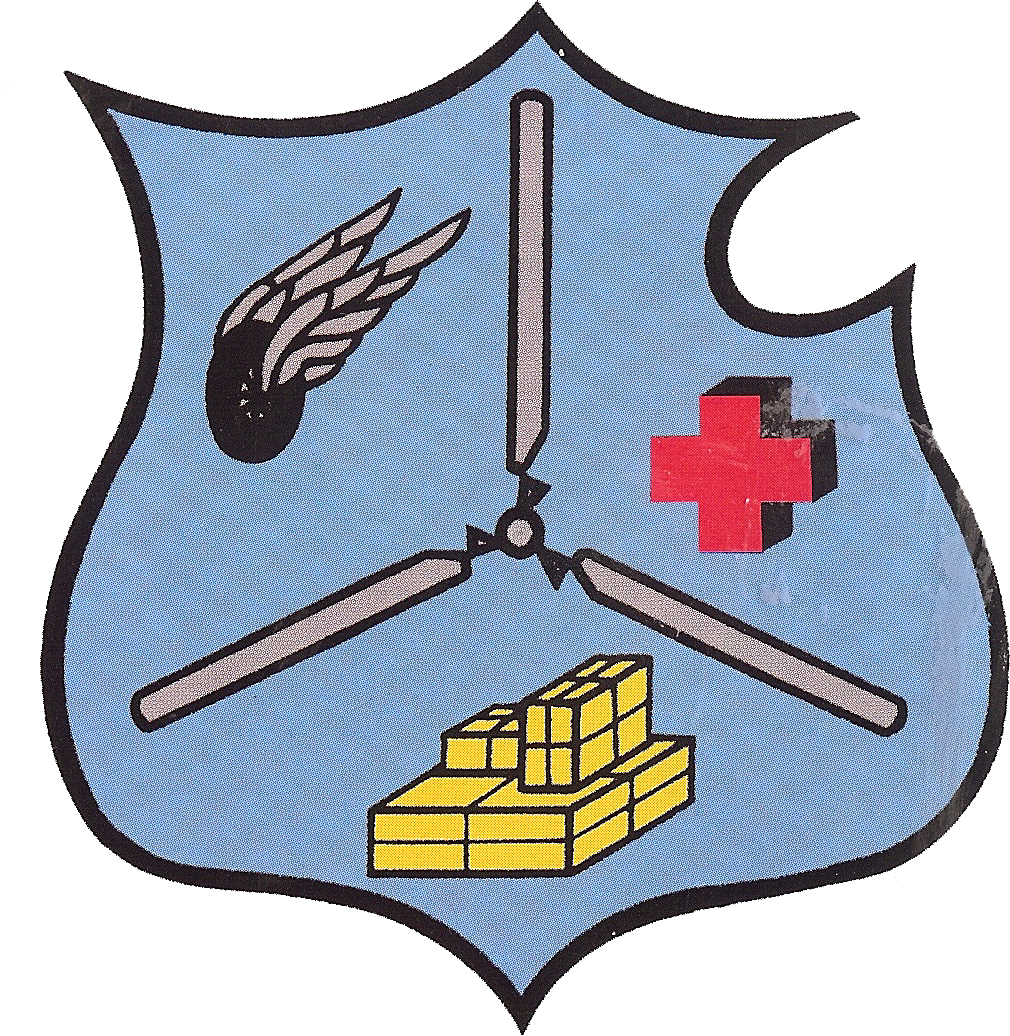
- 23d Helicopter Squadron emblem

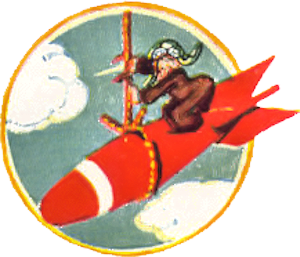
- 76th Bombardment Squadron emblem (approved 24 February 1943)

The 23rd Flying Training Squadron is a unit of the United States Air Force, currently assigned to 58th Operations Group performing helicopter training at Fort Rucker, Alabama.

== Mission ==
Since January 1994, the 23d Flying Training Squadron is the United States Air Force's primary source of helicopter pilots for special operations, combat search and rescue, missile support, and distinguished visitor airlift missions. Its mission is providing Air Force helicopter flight training for all undergraduate pilots proceeding to flying careers in the Air Force's UH-1N Huey, HH-60G Pave Hawk or CV-22 Osprey fleets. Tactical training includes alternate insertion and extraction (AIEs) but specialized training like hoists and gunnery is saved for type-qualification in post-graduate flight training at Kirtland AFB, New Mexico to smooth their transition in more complicated aircraft and missions. USAF rotary wing students receive their wings when their Fort Rucker pilot training class is completed.

== History ==
=== World War II ===
==== Antisubmarine operations in the Caribbean ====
The 23d's first predecessor is the 76th Bombardment Squadron (Medium) which was activated at Salt Lake City Army Air Base, Utah on 15 January 1941. It was redesignated the 23d Antisubmarine Squadron (Heavy) on 3 March 1943, and assigned to the 26th Antisubmarine Wing and moved to Imeson Field, Jacksonville, Florida with a variety of aircraft (North American B-25 Mitchell, Douglas O-43 and a Douglas B-18 Bolo). Coastal patrols were flown over the southeast coast looking for German U-boats.

It deployed to Batista Field, Cuba on 28 February 1943, where it conducted antisubmarine operations until 24 April, then moved to Edinburgh Field, Trinidad on 5 August 1943 and was attached to Antilles Air Command. From Trinidad, was moved to Zandrey Field, Surinam between 15 August 1943 and December. The unit also had elements at NAS Guantanamo Bay, Cuba, and rotated its crews to and from Florida to its far-flung operating elements about every 10 weeks. One flight of the squadron was temporarily stationed at Caracas Airport, Venezuela. With the Navy taking over the antisubmarine mission in mid-1943, the squadron returned to the United States via Borinquen Field, Puerto Rico, where unit personnel were reassigned to other units. It was disbanded on 6 February 1944.

==== Troop carrier operations in Europe ====
The second predecessor of the unit was activated as the 23d Troop Carrier Squadron on 21 November 1944 at Pope Field, North Carolina and equipped with Douglas C-47 Skytrains. Assigned to the 349th Troop Carrier Group of IX Troop Carrier Command in England, at RAF Barkston Heath, the unit transported cargo and personnel throughout the European Theater of Operation. Later operated from Advanced Landing Grounds in France, primarily resupply and casualty evacuation airfields, many times unsurfaced close to the front lines. Was upgraded to the Curtiss C-46 Commando in early 1945. Inactivated on 7 September 1946 after serving with the United States Air Forces in Europe as an intra-theater transport squadron supporting the occupation forces in Germany.

=== Helicopter airlift ===
The activation of the 23d Helicopter Squadron on 9 July 1956, was the result of the inactivation of the 516th Troop Carrier Group (Assault, Rotary Wing). The 516th had been a victim of an Air Force and Army dispute over control of assault helicopters. The squadron was activated at Sewart Air Force Base, Tennessee, and assigned to Eighteenth Air Force. The squadron was formed by absorbing the personnel, aircraft, and equipment of the 345th Troop Carrier Squadron (Assault, Rotary Wing).

The squadron moved to Phalsbourg-Bourscheid Air Base France, the squadron arrived at the new base between 7 and 15 November 1956, equipped with Piasecki H-21 helicopters. Built for a tactical fighter wing, Phalsbourg had plenty of hangar space and quarters for the 23d Squadron. It could keep all its H-21Bs indoors.

The 23d Helicopter Squadron provided useful general airlift support throughout France. Standard helicopter missions included: Special Airlift Missions, Administrative Support Mission, and Emergency Air Evacuation Missions. It transferred injured U.S. personnel and dependents that required major medical attention to full-service hospitals from remote military sites across Europe. It was assigned to the 322d Air Division at Évreux-Fauville Air Base, France for operational control, mission scheduling, and airlift priorities. The 322d recommended that the 23d Helicopter Squadron be divided into four detachments for greater utilization.

- Detachments #1 and #4 remained at Phalsbourg with ten aircraft. Major maintenance was performed by teams dispatched from Phalsbourg, and all H-21B-peculiar spare parts were stocked at Phalsbourg.
- Detachment #2 flew four H-21s to RAF Wethersfield, England. These four H-21Bs were equipped with air-sea hoist provisions for rescue flights.
- Detachment #3 relocated four H-21s to Wheelus Air Base, Libya in December 1956 to support gunnery range operations at El Uotia and Tarhuna, and to assist the Martin TM-61 Matador missile launches and flight test programs.

After a year of operation, USAFE felt the limitations of helicopter airlift were not worth the costs, and decided to eliminate the 23d Helicopter Squadron from its force structure after fourteen months in Europe. Also during this same time, the United States Army in France was obtaining similar helicopter airlift capabilities, and the mission of the 23d could be transferred to USAREUR.

The squadron was inactivated on 8 January 1958. However, the Detachment at Wheelus was so successful that after the 23d departed France, six of their H-21Bs continued to operate, as part of the 7272d Flying Training Wing. During 1960 the Wheelus helicopters participated in an ongoing long distance rescue mission when they evacuated American and European civilians from the Republic of the Congo (Léopoldville), where they were being threatened by rioting native troops.

=== Vietnam War ===
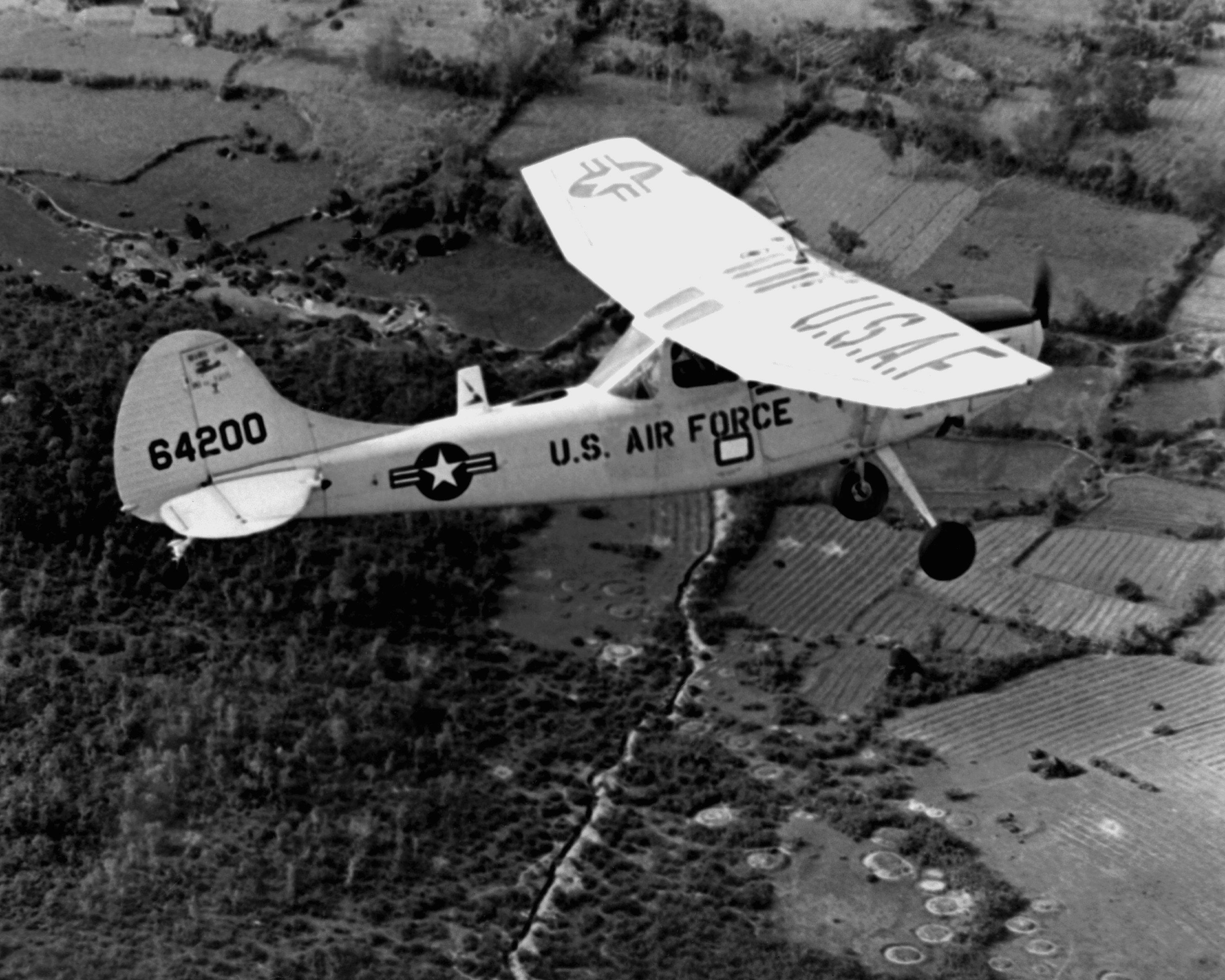
U.S. Air Force 0-1E Bird Dog aircraft (USAF Photo).

The final predecessor of the squadron was organized on 15 April 1966 as the 23d Tactical Air Support Squadron at Udorn Royal Thai Air Force Base, Thailand, and operated from Nakhon Phanom Royal Thai Air Force Base, Thailand, from 15 April 1966 – 22 September 1975.

The 23d Tactical Air Support Squadron was created out of the personnel and equipment of Detachment 3 of the 505th Tactical Control Group Lt. Col. (selectee) Robert L. Johnston. Lt. Col Johnston selected Nakhon Phanom Royal Thai Air Force Base for operations in the Steel Tiger portion of the Ho Chi Minh Trail between Nape Pass and Tchepone in the Laos Panhandle. (Note: Officially, the squadron was headquartered at Udorn Royal Thai Air Force Base, but only personnel and pay records were handled there.) It was the first USAF combat squadron to be stationed at Nakhon Phanom to operate across the Mekong River over Laos. Its operations would be countered by a North Vietnamese increase in number, type, and caliber of antiaircraft weaponry. By 1972, the Ho Chi Minh Trail would be defended by guns ranging from heavy machine guns to 100mm cannon, and both truck-borne and man-portable surface to air missiles.

Five Forward Air Controller (FAC)s went to Nakhon Phanom in January to test the idea of working the Steel Tiger portion of the Ho Chi Minh Trail, and many more came there on temporary duty during the following months. Losses of 23d pilots started in March with Capt. Karl Edward Worst, whose plane disappeared 2 March 1966 in an apparent mid-air collision with a Republic F-105 Thunderchief during an air strike.

The unit and mission were initially called Operation Cricket, which name the area airborne control ship took for a call sign, and the original pilot call sign was "Gombey". This was changed to "Nail" in mid-1966, and "Nail" remained a call sign until war's end. The 23d also used the call sign "Rustic". The 23d's well-known unit patch featuring Jiminy Cricket with a walkie-talkie and an umbrella was sold to the squadron by Walt Disney for $1 in response to a request from Nail pilot John Taylor.

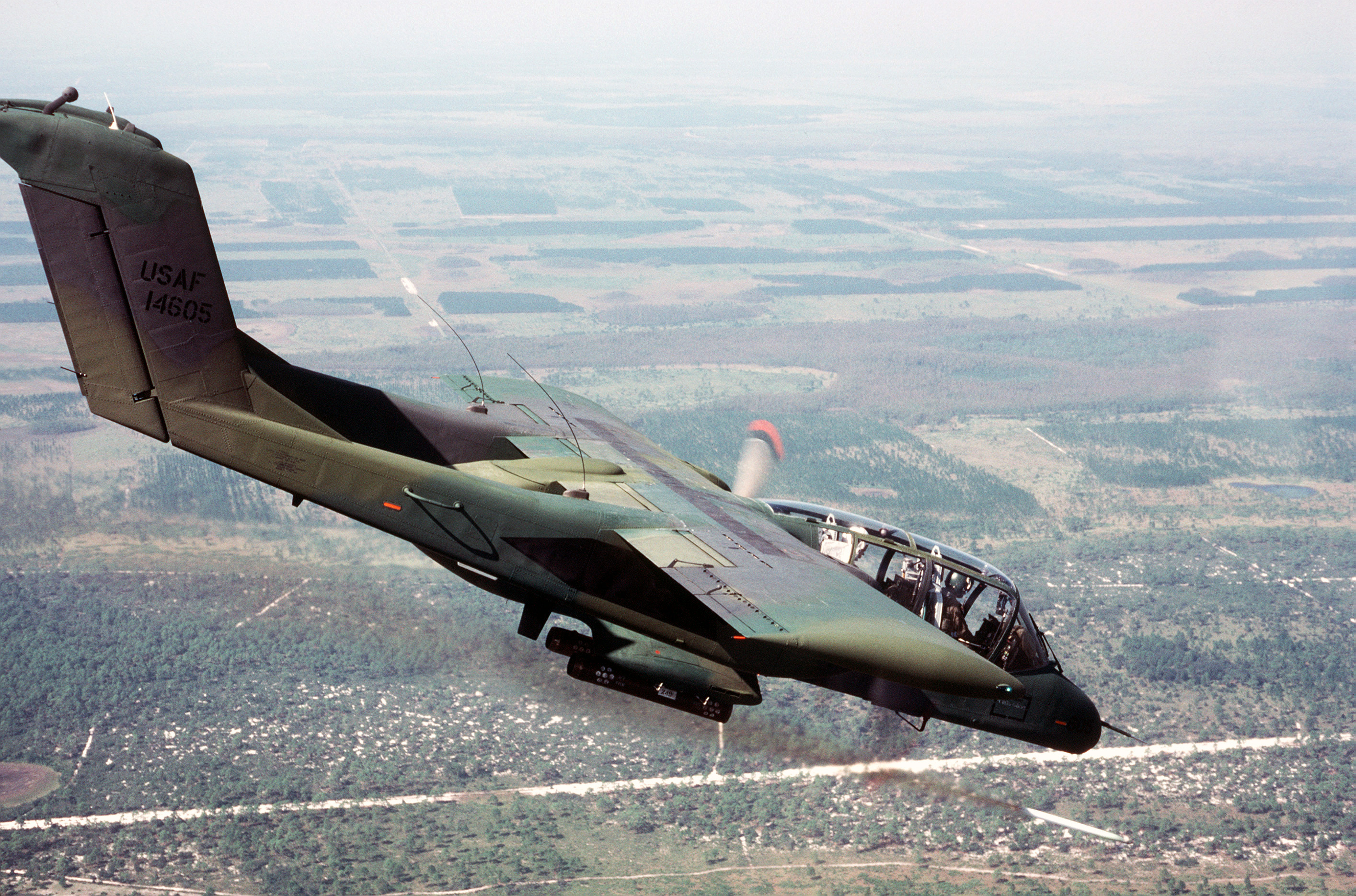
OV-10 Bronco aircraft firing a white phosphorus smoke rocket

The 23d, like its sister FAC squadrons based in Vietnam, initially flew Cessna O-1 Bird Dogs in 1966 and into 1968, when the last one was retired. All of its O-1's were the F variant, which featured a variable-pitch propeller. In 1967, the unit began receiving Cessna O-2 Skymasters to replace the O-1s. In 1969, the squadron began to receive North American OV-10 Broncos, and flew that aircraft until the end of the war. Over the course of the war, the 23d lost 7 O-1s, 15 O-2s, and 23 OV-10s.

The 23d lost at least 27 pilots during the war, and its pilots received many Air Force combat decorations. On 27 January 1973, one day before the Paris Peace Accords came into effect, a squadron OV-10 Bronco #68-3806, call sign Nail 89 acting as forward air controller for the attempted rescue of a Navy F-4 Phantom II crew, was hit by an SA-7 missile, both crewmen ejected and radio contact was established with one of them who said he was about to be captured. Neither crewman was returned during Operation Homecoming and both are listed as presumptive finding of death.

On 12 April 1975 the 23d supported Operation Eagle Pull, the evacuation of Phnom Penh, Cambodia. The 23d was inactivated on 22 September 1975.

=== Reactivation in the US ===
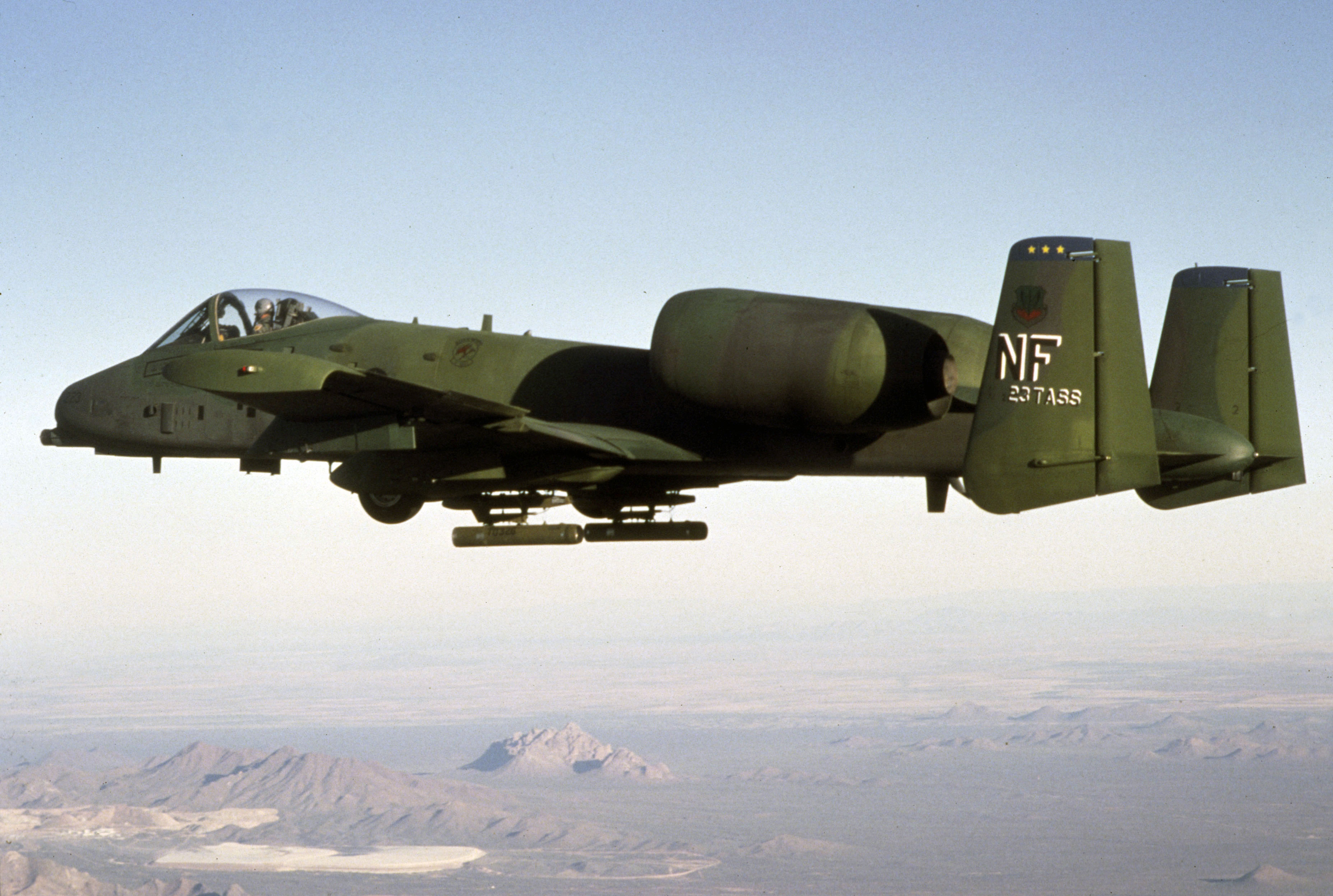
OA-10 Thunderbolt of the 23d TASS, Davis-Monthan AFB, Tucson, AZ (USAF photo).

The squadron was reactivated on 30 November 1975 at as part of the 602d Tactical Air Control Wing at Bergstrom Air Force Base, Texas, where it trained OV-10 forward air controllers before moving to Davis-Monthan Air Force Base, Arizona on 1 July 1980. The 27th Tactical Air Support Squadron, an O-2A sister squadron, was at Davis-Monthan. The 27th was inactivated and the 23d assumed its mission, personnel and equipment, until it was again inactivated on 1 November 1991. The 23d operated 26 Cessna OA-37 Dragonflys. In September 1985, as part of a program to merge Air Force units formed after World War II with units that had seen service during the war, the 23d Tactical Air Support Squadron was consolidated with its three predecessor units.

=== Helicopter pilot training ===
The squadron was redesignated the 23d Flying Training Flight on 22 December 1993, it was reactivated on 15 January 1994 at Fort Rucker (formerly Fort Novosel), Alabama as part of the 542d Operations Group at Kirtland Air Force Base, which conducted USAF helicopter training.

Reassigned to the 58th Operations Group on 1 April 1994, it was redesignated as the 23d Flying Training Squadron on 21 December 1999. At Fort Rucker, it is housed in three geographically separated facilities and a simulator facility off-base, the 23d handles academic, simulator, and flight line training.

The Beechcraft C-12 Huron was added to the 23d's aircraft inventory in 2000. In addition to the helicopter pilot training, the 23d, with Detachment 5, Air Mobility Command Air Operations Squadron, oversees the formal training for the Air Force's C-12 C/D Super King Air 200. Detachment 5 conducts all USAF C-12 flight evaluations, and also assists HQ DIA/Air Operations in worldwide flight evaluations upon request. Detachment 5, in association with HQ Air Mobility Command develops, publishes, and implements curriculum for several courses, including academics, simulator training, flight training for Air Force C-12 initial qualification and initial instructor qualification.

=== Operations and decorations ===
- Combat Operations. Antisubmarine patrols off the U.S. coast, Dec 1941 – Dec 1943. Transported personnel and cargo in Europe, 1944–1945. Reconnaissance and forward air control over the Ho Chi Minh Trail in Southeast Asia, Apr 1966 – Jan 1973. Tactical air control for the evacuation of Phnom Penh, Cambodia and the SS Mayaguez Incident, Apr and May 1975.
- Campaigns. World War II: Antisubmarine, American Theater. Vietnam: Vietnam Air; Vietnam Air Offensive; Vietnam Air Offensive, Phase II; Vietnam Air Offensive, Phase III; Vietnam Air Offensive, Phase IV; TET 69/Counteroffensive; Vietnam Summer-Fall 1969; Vietnam Winter-Spring, 1970; Sanctuary Counteroffensive; Southwest Monsoon; Commando Hunt V; Commando Hunt VI; Commando Hunt VII; Vietnam Ceasefire. Southwest Asia: Defense of Saudi Arabia; Liberation and Defense of Kuwait.
- Decorations. Presidential Unit Citations (Southeast Asia): 15 Apr-30 Sep 1966; 1 Aug 1968 – 31 Aug 1969; 1 Nov 1968 – 1 May 1969; 1 Jan-31 Dec 1970; 30 Jan-31 Dec 1971; 1 Apr 1972 – 22 Feb 1973. Air Force Outstanding Unit Awards with Combat "V": 1 Nov 1969 – 31 May 1970; 23 Feb 1973 – 28 Feb 1974; 24 Jan-2 May 1975. Air Force Outstanding Unit Awards: 1 Jul 1978 – 30 Jun 1979; 1 May 1984 – 30 Apr 1986; [15 Jan 1994]-30 Jun 1994; 1 Jul 1994 – 31 Dec 1995; 1 Jul 1996 – 30 Jun 1998; 1 Jul 1998 – 30 Jun 2000; 1 Jul 2001 – 30 Jun 2002; 1 Jul 2002 – 30 Jun 2003; 1 Jul 2003 – 30 Jun 2004; 1 Jul 2004 – 30 Jun 2005; 1 Jul 2006 – 30 Jun 2007; 1 Jul 2007 – 30 Jun 2008. Republic of Vietnam Gallantry Cross with Palm: [15] Apr 1966-28 Jan 1973; 8 Feb −31 Mar 1971; 1 Apr 1971 – 9 Mar 1972.

== Lineage ==
23d Antisubmarine Squadron

- Constituted as the 76th Bombardment Squadron (Medium) on 20 November 1940

Activated on 15 January 1941
Redesignated 23d Antisubmarine Squadron (Heavy) on 3 March 1943
Disbanded on 6 February 1944

- Reconstituted on 19 September 1985 and consolidated with the 23d Troop Carrier Squadron, the 23d Helicopter Squadron and the 23d Tactical Air Support Squadron as the 23d Tactical Air Support Squadron

23d Troop Carrier Squadron

- Constituted as the 23d Troop Carrier Squadron on 11 November 1944

Activated on 1 December 1944
Inactivated on 7 September 1946

- Consolidated on 19 September 1985 with the 23d Antisubmarine Squadron, the 23d Helicopter Squadron and the 23d Tactical Air Support Squadron as the 23d Tactical Air Support Squadron

23d Helicopter Squadron

- Constituted as the 23d Helicopter Squadron on 24 February 1956

Activated on 9 July 1956
Inactivated on 8 January 1958

- Consolidated on 19 September 1985 with the 23d Antisubmarine Squadron, the 23d Troop Carrier Squadron and the 23d Tactical Air Support Squadron as the 23d Tactical Air Support Squadron

23d Flying Training Squadron

- Constituted as the 23d Tactical Air Support Squadron on 8 April 1966 and activated (not organized)

Organized on 15 April 1966
Inactivated on 22 September 1975

- Activated on 30 November 1975
- Consolidated on 19 September 1985 with the 23d Antisubmarine Squadron, the 23d Troop Carrier Squadron and the 23d Helicopter Squadron

Inactivated on 1 November 1991

- Redesignated 23d Flying Training Flight and activated on 15 January 1994

Redesignated 23d Flying Training Squadron on 21 December 1999

=== Assignments ===
- 42d Bombardment Group, 15 January 1941 (air echelon attached to 45th Bombardment Group c. 21 May 1942: Army Air Forces Antisubmarine Command, 13 October 1942; 26th Antisubmarine Wing, 20 November 1942 – 9 March 1943)
- 41st Bombardment Group, 12 February 1943
- AAF Antisubmarine Command, 3 March 1943
- 26th Antisubmarine Wing, 9 March 1943 (attached to Trinidad Detachment, Antilles Air Command after 5 August 1943
- I Bomber Command, 15 October 1943 (attached to Trinidad Detachment, Antilles Air Command until December 1943
- XX Bomber Command, 6 February 1944 – 6 February 1944
- 60th Troop Carrier Wing, 21 November 1944
- 349th Troop Carrier Group, 1 December 1944 – 7 September 1946
- Eighteenth Air Force, 9 July 1956
- 322d Air Division, 1 November 1956 – 8 January 1958
- Pacific Air Forces, 8 April 1966 (not organized)
- 505th Tactical Control Group, 15 April 1966 – 7 December 1966 (attached to Tactical Air Support Group Provisional, 6250th, 1 September 1966; Tactical Air Support Group Provisional, 6253d after 9 September 1966)
- 504th Tactical Air Support Group, 8 December 1966
- 56th Special Operations Wing, 15 March 1972
- Thirteenth Air Force, 30 June–22 September 1975 (attached to 656th Special Operations Wing)
- 602d Tactical Air Control Group (later 602d Tactical Air Control Wing, 602d Air Control Wing), 30 November 1975 – 1 November 1991
- 542d Operations Group, 15 January 1994
- 58th Operations Group, 1 April 1994 – present

=== Stations ===
- Salt Lake City Army Air Base, Utah, 15 January 1941
- Gowen Field, Idaho, 4 June 1941
- McChord Field, Washington, 20 January 1942 (operated from Jacksonville Municipal Airport, Florida, c. 21 May-24 July 1942; Opa Locka Naval Air Station, Florida, 24 July-6 August 1942; Drew Field, Florida, 6 August 1942 – 24 February 1943; Batista Field, Cuba, 28 February-24 April 1943)
- Drew Field, Florida, 8 March 1943

Operated from: Langley Field, Virginia, 9–23 July 1943

- Edinburgh Field, Trinidad, 5 August 1943 (the ground echelon remained at Drew Field until 15 October 1943 then moved to Smoky Hill Army Air Field, Kansas, where it was disbanded on 6 November 1943. A detachment of air echelon operated from Zandery Field, Surinam, 15 August – December 1943)
- Drew Field, Florida, 24 December 1943
- Clovis Army Air Field, New Mexico, 6 February 1944 – 6 February 1944
- Pope Field, North Carolina, 21 November 1944
- Baer Field, Indiana, 7–15 March 1945
- RAF Barkston Heath (AAF-483), England, 3 April 1945
- Roye-Amy Airfield, (A-73) France, 18 April-13 July 1945
- Bergstrom Field, Texas, 19 September 1945 – 7 September 1946
- Sewart Air Force Base, Tennessee, 9 July-12 October 1956
- Phalsbourg-Bourscheid Air Base, France, 1 November 1956 – 8 January 1958
- Udorn Royal Thai Air Force Base, Thailand, 15 April 1966
- Nakhon Phanom Royal Thai Navy Base, Thailand, 15 July 1966 – 22 September 1975
- Bergstrom Air Force Base, Texas, 30 November 1975
- Davis-Monthan Air Force Base, Arizona, 1 July 1980 – 1 November 1991
- Fort Rucker, Alabama, 15 January 1994 – present

=== Aircraft ===
- Douglas B-18 Bolo, 1941
- Martin B-26 Marauder, 1941–1942
- Lockheed A-29 Hudson, 1942–1943
- North American B-25 Mitchell, 1943
- Curtiss C-46 Commando, 1944–1946
- Douglas C-47 Skytrain, 1944–1945
- Piasecki H-21, 1956–1957
- Cessna O-1 Bird Dog, 1966–1968
- Cessna O-2 Skymaster, 1975–1981
- North American OV-10 Bronco, 1974–1980
- Cessna OA-37 Dragonfly, 1981–1991
- Fairchild Republic OA-10 Thunderbolt II, 1987–1991
- Bell UH-1H Huey, 1994–2012
- Bell TH-1H Huey, 2007–present
