= Operation Honorable Dragon =

1970 offensive in the Second Indochina War

- Part of Laotian Civil War; Vietnam War
Date	31 August – 25 September 1970
Location	Pakse Site 26
Result	Royalists take PS 26 in attempt to disrupt the Ho Chi Minh Trail

Belligerents
Laos; Supported by United States	North Vietnam; Supported by: Soviet Union; China

Units involved
Ad hoc Special Guerrilla Unit; Mobile 2 Mobile 3 Brown Battalion; Bataillon Guerrier 224; Military Region 4 battalion	Group 559

Strength
Battalion-size	~50,000

Casualties and losses
Unknown	Unknown

Operation Honorable Dragon (also known as Operation Gauntlet) was an offensive of the Second Indochina War. The Central Intelligence Agency, which equipped and trained the needed troops, aimed at disruption of the North Vietnamese communist supply line, the Ho Chi Minh Trail. Launched by six battalions of Royal Lao Army military irregulars on 31 August 1970, the operation achieved only limited success. Although the planned objective was captured on 25 September, the offensive was plagued by desertions and combat refusals, including a battalion that ran from "ghosts". After the conquest of Pakse Site 26, troops of the People's Army of Vietnam (PAVN) harassed the Lao occupiers through mid-December 1970.

== Overview ==
After World War II, France fought the First Indochina War to retain French Indochina. Following the French defeat at Dien Ben Phu and the subsequent 1954 Geneva Agreements a neutral Laos gained its independence. When France withdrew most of its military in conformity with the treaty, the United States filled the vacuum with purportedly civilian paramilitary instructors. A North Vietnamese-backed communist insurrection had begun as early as 1949. Invading during the opium harvest season of 1953, a North Vietnamese communist force settled in northeastern Laos adjacent to the border of the Democratic Republic of Vietnam.

As the Laotian Civil War flared from 1961 onward, the Central Intelligence Agency (CIA) carried out a paramilitary program designed to foster a guerrilla army to support the Royal Lao Government (RLG) in northern Laos. Paralleling that, the U.S. Department of Defense covertly supported the regular Royal Lao Army and other Lao armed forces through a sub rosa supply system, as the U.S. picked up the entire budget of the Kingdom of Laos. Meanwhile, the Annamese Cordillera in southern Laos became the haven for a logistics network, the Ho Chi Minh Trail. The communist war effort in South Vietnam depended on that supply route.

== Military activity ==
In May 1970, Royalist regulars attempted to dislodge the PAVN garrison from its fortification atop Pakse Site 26, but failed.

In Summer 1970, Pakse Unit of the CIA planned a rainy season operation in Military Region 4 (MR 4). As MR 4 lacked sufficient forces for an offensive, the forces came from other Military Regions. MR 1 sent a battalion of 560 troops cobbled together from Special Guerrilla Units 1 and 2. MR 3, which was just north of Pakse, forwarded three guerrilla battalions—Mobile 2, Mobile 3, and Brown Battalion. These three battalions rendezvoused at Pakse Site 22. With Kou Kiet running in MR 2 on that region's own reinforcements "borrowed" from other regions, MR 2 still supplied a freshly trained unit of 560 trainees, Bataillon Guerrier 224 (Warrior Battalion 224, or BG 224).

Using these five "borrowed" battalions, plus one of their own, Pakse Unit launched Honorable Dragon (sometimes called Operation Gauntlet) on 31 August 1970 with the goal of taking Pakse Site 26 from its PAVN garrison. Mobile 3 moved south from PS 22; its goal was linkage with half of MR 1's Special Guerrilla Unit (SGU). They would then block any possible communist reinforcements emerging from Attopeu. Meanwhile, the remainder of MR 1's SGU joined Pakse's own SGU 3 in assaulting PS 26 from the southwest. The rest of the attacking Royalist forces were moving in on PS 26 from the north at the same time. On 11 September, MACV-SOG launched its own incursion from South Vietnam into Laos, dispatching a reconnaissance company on Operation Tailwind. Aimed at a communist logistical center near Chavane, it served as a distraction from Honorable Dragon.

On the second day of the offensive, the southern column of Royalist attackers were hit with a combined barrage of mortar and DK-82 recoilless rifle fire. Tactical air strikes blasted the PS 26 summit. Ignoring the goal, two companies of the MR 1 guerrillas then left the assault and climbed back onto the Bolovens Plateau to Pakse Site 38. They reminded their CIA case officer they had been committed to MR 4 for a three-month tour, which had just expired, and that they should be sent back to MR 1.

The Hmong guerrillas' accompaniment stormed PS 26. PAVN regulars who had been powdered by dust blown about by air strikes defended the site. The irregulars of SGU 3 superstitiously fled these "ghosts".

Meanwhile, the northern Royalist column, the main thrust of the attack, stalled and began to retreat without joining the assault. After the relief of the White Battalion commander, it was joined by a company from the inert Mobile 2. The joint force launched its attack on the northern slopes of PS 26. At about this time, at the personal urging of General Vang Pao, his BG 224 swept up its southern slopes. On 25 September 1970, the last few PAVN troopers were ousted from the PS 26 summit by the Honorable Dragon forces.

With all its bumbling, the Honorable Dragon did not yield a promising victory. The American air attaché, in his end-of-tour intelligence report dated 22 September, felt that MR 4 was due for more territorial losses to PAVN. After his departure, on 21 November 1970, the PAVN chased away the two guerrilla battalions occupying PS 26. Six days later, Pakse Site 26 fell to the PAVN. The Royalists at Pakse Site 22 hung on through nightly communist probes.

== Aftermath ==
In early December, PS 22 was reinforced with two additional battalions of Royalist regulars, Bataillon Infanterie 7 (Battalion of Infantry 7, or BI 7) and Bataillon Infanterie 25 (Battalion of Infantry 25, or BI 25). After a few days, BI 7, BI 25, and over half the guerrillas deserted the position. By hastily importing 102 Bataillon Parachutistes (102nd Battalion of Parachutists, or 102 BP) from Military Region 3, PS 22 was held against communist attacks during the first fortnight of December. The CIA assigned two case agents in a Pilatus Porter to overfly and encourage 102 BP. U.S. Air Force AC-119 gunships flew cover over PS 22. The Royalist position held.

== Bibliography ==
- Ahern, Thomas L. Jr. (2006), Undercover Armies: CIA and Surrogate Warfare in Laos. Center for the Study of Intelligence. Classified control no. C05303949.
- Castle, Timothy N. (1993). At War in the Shadow of Vietnam: U.S. Military Aid to the Royal Lao Government 1955–1975. Columbia University Press. ISBN 0-231-07977-X.
- Conboy, Kenneth and James Morrison (1995). Shadow War: The CIA's Secret War in Laos. Paladin Press. ISBN 978-1-58160-535-8.
- Dommen, Arthur J., Chapter 1. Historical Setting. Savada, Andrea Matles, ed. (1995). Laos a country study. Federal Research Division, Library of Congress. ISBNs 0844408328, 978-0844408323.
- Sander, Robert D. (2014). Invasion of Laos, 1971: Lam Son 719. University of Oklahoma Press. ISBNs 0806145897, 9780806145891.
