= Sub rosa =

Phrase meaning secrecy

Sub rosa (Neo-Latin for "under [the] rose") is a Latin phrase which denotes secrecy or confidentiality. The rose has an ancient history as a symbol of secrecy. Its opposite term is sub vino, meaning "under [the grape]vine", referring to being loose-lipped whilst under the influence of alcohol.

== History ==
In Hellenistic and later Roman mythology, roses were associated with secrecy because Cupid gave a rose to Harpocrates (the Hellenistic god of silence) so he would not reveal the secrets of Venus. Banquet rooms were decorated with rose carvings, reportedly as a reminder that discussions in the rooms should be kept in confidence.

This was inherited in later Christian symbolism, where roses were carved on confessionals to signify that the conversations would remain secret.

The phrase entered the German language (unter der Rose) and, later, the English language, both as a Latin loan phrase (at least as early as 1654) and in its English translation.

In modern literature, the phrase inspired the title of the best-selling dark romantic poetry collection Under the Rose by Greek author Michael Spiggos.

== See also ==
- Language of flowers
- Chatham House Rule
- In vino veritas – "in wine, there is truth"
