= Group 559 =

Transportation and logistics unit of the North Vietnamese Army during the Vietnam War

12th Army Corps Truong Son Construction Corporation
- Binh đoàn 12; Tổng công ty Xây dựng Trường Sơn
- Founded: 19 May 1959
- Country: Vietnam
- Allegiance: Ministry of National Defence
- Type: Military enterprise
- Size: 15,000 soldiers
- Garrison/HQ: Km 6+500 Thang Long Avenue, Xuan Phuong Ward, Hanoi.
- Nickname: Group 559 (Đoàn 559)
- Anniversaries: 19 May

Commanders
- Commanding General: Maj. Gen Nguyễn Hữu Ngọc
- Secretary of the Party Committee - Deputy Commander: Senior colonel Nguyễn Thế Lực
- Deputy Commander: Senior colonel Nguyễn Tuấn Anh
- Deputy Commander: Senior colonel Khương Tất Thắng
- Deputy Commander: Senior colonel Võ Khắc Hùng
- Deputy Commander: Senior colonel Lê Tiến Dũng
- Deputy Commander: Senior colonel Trần Bạch Dương

Group 559 was a transportation and logistical unit of the People's Army of Vietnam. Established on 19 May 1959 to move troops, weapons, and materiel from North Vietnam to Vietcong paramilitary units in South Vietnam, the unit created and maintained the Ho Chi Minh Trail, the supply line that helped the North win the Vietnam War.

The purpose of these activities was the support of Vietcong in their struggle to topple the southern regime of President Ngo Dinh Diem. This task was made more difficult by the presence of a demilitarized zone (DMZ) on the border separating the two countries, though the North Vietnamese did send some supplies across the DMZ, their major infrastructure went around it. Group 559 developed road lines through Laos and Cambodia that fed into various areas of northern and western South Vietnam. This system of roads became known as the Ho Chi Minh Trail and was used under the supervision of Group 559 to infiltrate weapons, ammunition, and cadres into the South.

Subordinate to the Rear Services General Directorate, the troop consisted of two transportation battalions. In 1960, Group 559 is upgraded to division-level, and established the 70th Regiment. In 1961, the 71st Regiment was set up. By 1962, the group had 6,000 troops organized into two regiments equipped with bicycles and a few trucks. Within one year the force level grew to 24,000 troops and six motorized transport battalions plus engineering, anti-aircraft, and security elements.

After the commitment of U.S. and allied forces to the Vietnam War in 1965, Group 559 moved a volume of supplies nearly equal to the total volume of the preceding five years. Increasing North Vietnamese involvement, including the introduction of large ground units, in the southern war and U.S. interdiction of PAVN's logistical system at sea sharply increased the group's overland route. On April 3, 1965, Group 559 acquired the corps-level status of a Military Region reporting directly to the Military Affairs Party Committee and the General Staff, with three subordinate commands for the supply corridors through Laos.

Preparations for large-scale main force offensives, both during and after the U.S. withdrawal sharply increased logistical requirements. In July 1973 the group, redesignated the Truong Son Command, converted sectoral and way station forces into divisions or regiments and established five additional regiments. By late 1974, forces under its command included Anti-Aircraft Division 377, Infantry Division 968, the 5 regional commands (division-level): 470th, 471st, 472nd, 473rd and 571st. plus fourteen regiments and various repair facilities and hospitals with total personnel of 100,495.

During Vietnam War, Group 559 transported more than one million tons cargo into the front, inside over 500,000 tons delivered into theater B (chiến trường B). In 1975 when the war ended, Group 559 was reorganized into 12th Corps (Binh đoàn) to rebuild Ho Chi Minh Trail into roads for economics and national defense.

Group 579 and Group 959 were created somewhat later, with similar but different missions. Group 579 was charged with infiltrating supplies into South Vietnam by sea, complementing the land based operations of Group 559. It was created in May 1959. (Conboy et al., p. 8) Group 959 was created in September 1959 to move supplies through Laos and to act as a headquarters for PAVN forces supporting the Pathet Lao.
