= List of military operations =

Coordinated missions, operations and projects

This is a list of missions, operations, and projects. Missions in support of other missions are not listed independently.

== World War I ==
See also List of military engagements of World War I

- Albion (1917) (German Empire) — German capture of Oesel, Dagö and Moon Islands (now Saaremaa, Hiiumaa and Muhu).
- Hush (1917) (United Kingdom) (France) — Planned Allied amphibious landing on the Belgian coast.
- Kaiserschlacht ('Kaiser's battle') (1918) (German Empire) — German spring offensive using armies released from the Eastern Front composed of 4 offensives:
  - Blücher-Yorck (1918) (German Empire)
  - Gneisenau (1918) (German Empire)
  - Georgette (1918) (German Empire)
  - Michael (1918) (German Empire)
- Strafexpedition (Punitive Expedition) (1916) — operation by the Austro-Hungarian Army against Italy (Italian northern front): the largest mountain battle ever fought.
- Z-O (1918) (United Kingdom) — British raid on Zeebrugge.

== World War II ==
See List of World War II military operations

== Cold War era ==
=== Asia ===
- Pig Bristle (1946) (Australia) — Unusual Australian operation to fly pig bristles needed to manufacture paint brushes out of China during the Chinese Civil War
- Ajax (1953) (United Kingdom) (United States) — Anglo-American plan for Iranian coup d'état that deposed Mohammed Mosaddeq and reinstalled Mohammad Reza Pahlavi
- Operation Desert Hawk (1965) (Pakistan) — Pakistani Military operation in the disputed Rann of kutch area against Indian offensive.
- Atilla (1974) (Turkey) — Turkish invasion of Cyprus, leading to subsequent occupation of northern Cyprus
- Operation Seroja (1975) — Indonesian invasion of East Timor, the largest Military Operation conducted by Indonesian military, leading to subsequent Integration of East Timor to Indonesia until 1999
- Cactus (1988) (India) — Indian armed forces oust Tamil nationalist mercenaries of PLOTE who instigated a coup in Malé in the Maldives.
- Operation Chengiz Khan (1971) — Pakistan Air Force launches preemptive attacks on Indian air bases.
- Claret (1964) (United Kingdom) (Australia) (New Zealand) — British SAS, NZSAS and Australian SASR patrols into Indonesia
  - Jock Scott (1952) (United Kingdom) — British rounding up of suspected insurgents at the beginning of the Mau Mau Uprising
  - Anvil (1954) (United Kingdom) — British counter-insurgency operation in Nairobi during the Mau Mau Uprising
- Eagle Claw (1980) (United States) — Attempted rescue of American hostages held in Tehran.
- Earnest Will (1987–88) (United States) — American protection of Kuwaiti oil tankers in the Persian Gulf during the Iran–Iraq War
  - Eager Glacier (1987–88) (United States) — U.S. spy planes gather intelligence about Iran.
  - Nimble Archer (1987) (United States) — U.S. retaliates for Iranian missile attack on reflagged Kuwaiti tanker.
  - Praying Mantis (1988) (United States) — U.S. retaliates against Iran for mining frigate.
  - Prime Chance (1987–88) — Special operations to protect Kuwaiti tankers, run largely from barges in the northern Persian Gulf.
- Evening Light (1980) (United States) — failed U.S. attempt to rescue embassy hostages in Tehran
- Gibraltar (1965) (Pakistan)
- Grand Slam (1965) (Pakistan)
- Lucky Alphonse (1956) (United Kingdom) — British sweep of Troodos area on Cyprus for EOKA
- Meghdoot (1984) (India) — Indian military's capture of the majority of Siachen Glacier.
- Nimrod (1980) — rescue of hostages in the Iranian embassy, London
- Paul Bunyan (1976) (United Nations) — UN forces remove a tree in the Korean Demilitarized Zone
- Sparrowhawk I, II and III (1956) (United Kingdom) — British operations against EOKA on Cyprus.
- Team Spirit (1976–1993) (United States) — Annual joint exercise with South Korean forces.
- Dwarka (1965) — Pakistan Navy's attack on the Indian coastal town of Dwarka on 7 September 1965. This was the first use of a Navy in the Indo-Pakistan Wars.
- Trident (1971) (India) — Indian Navy's bombing and blockade of Karachi Port, Pakistan.
- Storm-333 (1979) (Soviet Union) — Storming Afghan Political and military headquarters
- Grand Junction (1968) (United States) — North Korea's TET 1968 attempt to attack US assets in Seoul.

=== Europe ===
- Berlin Airlift of 1948:
  - Vittles (United States) — US part of the Berlin Airlift
  - Planefare (United Kingdom) — British part of the Berlin Airlift.
- Gladio (?) — Stockpiles of weapons in Italy, Switzerland, Austria and other countries for resistance to Soviet occupiers.
- Gold (1954) (United States) (United Kingdom) — covert American tunnel under the Berlin Wall
- Neptune (1964) (Soviet Union) — Soviet-led counterintelligence operation.
- Reforger (United States) — Annual American exercise to "return forces to Germany".
- Retail (1946) (United Kingdom) — British clearance of naval mines laid in Albanian waters.
- Silver (1949) (United Kingdom) — covert British communications tap in Austria
- Danube (1968) (Soviet Union) — Warsaw Pact invasion to halt Czechoslovakia's "Prague Spring" reforms
- Banner (1969–2007) (United Kingdom) Deployment of British troops to Northern Ireland to prevent sectarian killings and support the police during the 1969–1997 armed campaign of the Provisional IRA. Operation Banner resulted in over 700 British Armed Forces deaths and 303 police deaths at the hands of native Irish Republicans. 307 people were killed by the British troops, about 51% of whom were civilians and 42% of whom were members of republican paramilitaries.

=== South America ===
- Brother Sam (1964) (United States) — A US government contingency plan to support the military coup that overthrew the Brazilian constitutional president João Goulart, if the coup had faced armed resistance
- The track down operation (1967) (Bolivia) (United States) — that captured and executed Che Guevara
- Condor (1970s) — (Brazil) (Argentina) (Chile) (Uruguay) (Paraguay) (Bolivia) — A campaign run by then South American Military Dictatorships' intelligence services with United States' support, which goal was extrajudicial and secretly, find, capture and eliminate political dissidents who, had succeeded to escape political repression in their homelands but could be found in any of these other countries.

=== Central America and the Caribbean ===
- Fortune (1950s) (United States) — 1951 CIA plan for a coup in Guatemala. Executed as Success.
- Success (1954) (United States) — 1954 CIA coup in Guatemala.
- Northwoods (1960s) — plan to incite war between the United States and Cuba.
- Peter Pan (1960s) — transfer of Cubans to the US
- Operation Pluto (1961) (United States) — plan to invade Cuba and overthrow its government using a CIA-trained force of Cuban exiles.
- Mongoose (1962) (United States) — plan for information gathering, sabotage, civil insurrection and overthrow of the Cuban government.
- Phibriglex (1962) (United States) — US plan and mock invasion by its armed forces of a Caribbean island. The exercise took place on Vieques and the purpose of the mock invasion was to overthrow a fictitious leader called "Ortsac", whose name was, in fact, Castro spelled backwards. It occurred in August, shortly before the Cuban Missile Crisis. It is also known by the names Operation Ortsac, Operation Swift Strike II and Exercise Phibriglex-62.
- Anadyr (1962) (Soviet Union) — Cuban-Soviet plan to base nuclear weapons in Cuba; the cause of the Cuban Missile Crisis
  - Kama (1962) (Soviet Union) — Soviet plan to forward-base seven Soviet ballistic missile submarines in Mariel, Cuba (part of Anadyr)
- Power Pack (1965) (United States) (Brazil) — US deployment with OEA military support in the Dominican Republic
- Waverider (1972) (United States) —
  - Acid Gambit (United States) — Rescue of Kurt Muse.
  - Bushmaster (United States) — Security operations near US facilities.
- Urgent Fury (1983) (United States) — US invasion of Grenada
- Contras covert operation (1980s) (United States) — Covert operations undertaken by Ronald Reagan's administration to provide financial, military, logistic and supply support for the Contras
- Golden Pheasant (1988) (United States) — US deployment in Honduras
- Just Cause (1989) (United States) — US invasion of Panama

=== Southern Africa ===
- Hurricane (1972–1980) (Rhodesia) / (Zimbabwe Rhodesia) — Operations by Rhodesian security forces against ZIPRA and ZANU guerillas in Mashonaland.
- Overload (1974) (Rhodesia) — Rhodesian security forces operation to establish protected villages.
- Savannah (1975–76) (South Africa) — South African intervention in Angola in support of the National Liberation Front of Angola (FNLA).
- Carlota (1977) (Cuba) — Cuban Deployment to counter South African attacks to Angola.
- Dingo (1977) (Rhodesia) — Rhodesian attack on camps in Mozambique.
- Tangent (1977–1980) (Rhodesia) / (Zimbabwe Rhodesia) — Operations by Rhodesian security forces against insurgents in Matabeleland.
- Favour (1978–1980) / (Zimbabwe Rhodesia) — Training of former insurgents to serve as security force auxiliaries in Zimbabwe-Rhodesia.
- Reindeer (1978) (South Africa) — South African airborne attack on South West Africa People's Organization (SWAPO) base at Cassinga, Angola.
- Rekstok (1979) (South Africa) — South African attack on SWAPO bases in Angola.
- Saffraan (1979) (South Africa) — South African attack on SWAPO bases in Zambia.
- Klipklop (1980) (South Africa) — South African disruption of SWAPO logistics in Angola.
- Sceptic (1980) (South Africa) — South African attack on SWAPO bases in Angola.
- Protea (1981) (South Africa) — South African attack on SWAPO bases near Ongiva and Xangongo, Angola.
- Carnation (1981) (South Africa) — South African skirmishes with SWAPO forces along the Angolan border.
- Meebos (1982) (South Africa) — South African destruction of SWAPO's "East Front" HQ at Mupa, Angola.
- Askari (1983) (South Africa) — South African attack on SWAPO and People's Armed Forces for the Liberation of Angola (FAPLA) forces in Angola.
- Phoenix (1983) (South Africa) — South African response to mass SWAPO infiltration of South-West Africa
- Alpha Centauri (1986) (South Africa) — South African operation in support of the National Union for the Total Independence of Angola (UNITA) in Angola.
- Moduler (1987) (South Africa) — South African operation to reverse the FAPLA advance on Mavinga and Jamba.
- Hooper (1988) (South Africa) — South African operation followup to Modular in pursuit of retreating FAPLA forces.
- Packer (1988) (South Africa) — South African operation to push FAPLA and Cuban forces north of the Cuito River, following Hooper

=== Chad ===
- Bison (1969–1972) (France) — French intervention to counter FROLINAT insurgency.
- Tacaud (1978–1980) (France) — Operation to avoid FROLINAT rebels taking Chad's capital.
- Manta (1983–1984) (France) — Intervention in the Chadian-Libyan conflict.
- Épervier (1986–2014) (France) — French military presence in Chad originally designed to counter Libyan expansion in Northern Chad, then continued to support Chad during the Sudanese backed Chadian Civil War and later focused on counterterrorism against jihadi threats in the Sahel region.

=== Congo/Zaire ===
- Dragon Blanc (1964) (Belgium) — Operation White Dragon – Cancelled Belgian airborne intervention in Bunia – Congo
- Dragon Noir (1964) (Belgium) — Operation Black Dragon – Belgian airborne intervention in Paulis – Congo
- Dragon Rouge (1964) (Belgium) — Operation Red Dragon – Belgian airborne intervention in Stanleyville – Congo
- Dragon Vert (1964) (Belgium) — Operation Green Dragon – Cancelled Belgian airborne intervention in Watsa – Congo
- Verveine (1977) (France) — French intervention in Shaba – Zaire
- Bonite/Léopard (1978) (France) — French airborne intervention in Kolwezi – Zaire
- Red Bean (1978) (Belgium) — Belgian airborne intervention in Kolwezi – Zaire

=== Central African Republic ===
- Barracuda (1979–1981) (France) — Occupation of Bangui, Central African Republic as a peace-keeping intervention after the overthrow of Emperor Bokassa.
- Caban (1979) (France) — Capture of Bangui airport as a prelude to Operation Barracuda in order to overthrow Emperor Bokassa.

=== Falklands War (1982) ===
- Rosario (Argentina) — Argentine joint operation
  - Algeciras (Argentina) — Planned Argentine sabotage raid.
  - Azul (Argentina) — Argentine invasion of the Falkland Islands
- Corporate (United Kingdom) — British recapture of the islands
  - Paraquet (United Kingdom) — British recapture of South Georgia.
  - Black Buck (United Kingdom) — British long-range bombing raid
  - Keyhole (United Kingdom) — British commando raid on Thule Island
  - Purple Warrior — British training exercise incorporating lessons from the Falklands War
  - Sutton (United Kingdom) — British amphibious landings on San Carlos Water

=== Other ===
- Argus (1959) (United States) — test of nuclear bombs in the upper atmosphere.
- Blowdown (1963) (United States) (United Kingdom) — Australia/US/UK simulated nuclear explosion in a rain forest.
- Cyclone (1979) (United States) — US covert aid to Afghan mujahideen fighting the Soviets.
- El Dorado Canyon (1986) (United States) — US strikes against Libya
- Morning Light (1978) (Canada) (United States) — Joint Canadian-US effort to recover Kosmos 954, a nuclear-powered Soviet RORSAT.
- Operation Morris Dance (1987) (Australia) — Australian response to the first of the 1987 Fijian coups d'état.
- Mount Hope III (1988) (United States) — covert recovery of a crashed Soviet-made Mil helicopter from Africa.
- Nuclear testing List of all known named nuclear tests.

== Indochina War ==
- Adolphe (1953) (France) (South Vietnam) — French operation against Viet Minh in Indochina.
- Atlante (1954) (France) (South Vietnam) — French operation to pacify the local populace between Da Nang and Nha Trang and re-establish the sovereignty of the Bảo Đại government.
- Bretagne (1952–1953) (France) (South Vietnam) — French operation against Viet Minh in Indochina.
- Brochet (1953) (France) (South Vietnam) — French operation against Viet Minh in Indochina.
- Camargue (1953) (France) (South Vietnam) — French operation against Viet Minh in Indochina.
- Castor (1953) (France) (South Vietnam) — French airborne operation to establish a fortified airhead in Điện Biên Province.
- Ceinture (1947) (France) — French operation against Viet Minh in Indochina.
- Condor (1954) (France) — French relief attempt of Dien Bien Phu.
- Hirondelle (1953) (France) (South Vietnam) — French operation against Viet Minh in Indochina.
- Léa (1947) (France) (South Vietnam) — French airborne attempt to capture the leaders of the Viet Minh.
- Lorraine (1952) (France) (South Vietnam) — French operation against Viet Minh in Indochina.
- Masterdom (1945–1946) (United Kingdom) (France) — French and British Armies operation against Viet Minh in Indochina after the Liberation from Japan.
- Mouette (1953) (France) (South Vietnam) — French operation against Viet Minh in Indochina.
- Papillon (1947) (France) (South Vietnam) — French operation against Viet Minh in Indochina.
- Pollux (1953) (France) (South Vietnam) — French evacuation of troops stationed in Lai Châu Province.
- Vulture (1954) (United States) (France) — Aborted American air support of French troops against the Viet Minh around Dien Bien Phu.

== Korean War ==
- Operation Roll-Up (1949) (United States) — Refurbishment and redeployment of World War II equipment.
- Blue Hearts (1950) (United Nations) — UN amphibious landings at Pohang.
- Courageous (1951) (United Nations) — Movement of UN infantry units up the Imjin River.
  - Tomahawk (1951) (United States) — Deployment of airmobile forces in the Battle of the Imjin River.
- Commando (1951) (United Nations) — Attack to the Jamestown Line.
- Chromite (1950) (United Nations) — UN invasion at Inchon.
- Little Switch (1953) (North Korea) (China) — Exchange of sick and wounded prisoners of war between United Nations and North Korean/Chinese forces.
  - Big Switch (1953)
- Ripper (1951) (United Nations) — UN movements towards the 38th parallel to recapture Seoul.
- Operation Moolah (1953) (United Nations) — psychological operation against Communist MiG-15 pilots to defect.

== Vietnam War ==
- Arc Light (1965) (United States) — US B-52 bombing campaign in Vietnam
- Attleboro (1966) (United States) (South Vietnam) — U.S. and Army of the Republic of Vietnam (ARVN) air mobile operations in Tây Ninh.
- Babylift (1975) (United States) — mass evacuation/airlift of orphans from South Vietnam to the U.S. and other countries
- Barrel Roll (1964–73) (United States) (South Vietnam) — the bombing of Laos by U.S. forces, to support the Royal Laotian Army and CIA-trained Hmong.
  - Steel Tiger (1965–68) (United States)
  - Tiger Hound (1965–68) (United States) (South Vietnam)
  - Silver Bayonet (1965) — First major combat operation of the 1st Air Cavalry Div. (United States)
  - Commando Hunt (1968–72) (United States) (South Vietnam) — U.S. bombing of the Ho Chi Minh trail
- Bolo (1967) (United States) — Decoy mission to disguise the electronic signature of combat aircraft.
- Chopper (1962) (United States) (South Vietnam) — Major air mobile offensive near Saigon.
- Cedar Falls (1967) (United States) — Attack on National Front for the Liberation of South Vietnam (NVA or Viet Cong) positions in Bến Cát (the Iron Triangle)
- Dewey Canyon (1971) (United States) — Offensive against NVA communication lines in Laos.
- Enhance Plus (1972) (United States) — Resupply of military equipment and consumables to the government of South Vietnam.
- Flaming Dart (1965) (United States) — Reprisal bombing attacks by the U.S. Air Force against NVA units.
- Frequent Wind (1975) (United States) — Helicopter evacuation of U.S. citizens before the fall of Saigon.
- Game Warden (1965) (United States) — first major U.S. riverine patrol operation. Later Swift Boat operations included:
  - Ballistic Charge
  - Beacon Star
  - Beacon Torch
  - Bear Bite
  - Bear Claw
  - Beau Charger
  - Beau Diddley
  - Beaver Cage
  - Bold Mariner
  - Boone
  - Canyon
  - Daring Rebel
  - Deckhouse Five (1967) (United States) (South Vietnam)
  - DeSoto
  - Dragon Fire
  - Fortress Ridge
  - Seahawk
  - Sea Tiger
  - Market Time (1965) (United States)
- Hastings (1966) (United States) (South Vietnam) — U.S. and ARVN counter-offensive operations in Quảng Trị
- Homecoming (1973) (United States) — repatriation of U.S. prisoners of war from Vietnam
- Leap Frog (1968) (United States) — Systematic canvassing of the opinions of senior ARVN officers by U.S. military intelligence on likely NLF actions.
- Menu (1969) (United States) — U.S. bombing of Cambodia
- Malheur (1967) (United States) (South Vietnam) — Twin phased Search and destroy operations in Quảng Ngãi
- Pegasus (1968) (United States) (South Vietnam) — Resupply and relief operations to U.S. Marines besieged at Khe Sanh
- Phoenix (1968) (United States) — CIA-organized assassination campaign against influential NLF operatives in South Vietnam
- Rich (1968) — Combined arms assault near the Bến Hải River in the Vietnamese Demilitarized Zone
- Linebacker (1972) (United States) (South Vietnam) — Strategic bombing of Hanoi and Haiphong, and mining of Haiphong harbour.
- Ranch Hand (1961–71) (United States) — Spraying of herbicides (including Agent Orange) by aircraft and ground forces.
  - Trail Dust
- Rolling Thunder (1967–68) (United States) (South Vietnam) — Bombing of North Vietnam
- Sealords (1968) (United States) (South Vietnam) — Mekong Delta and inland waterways campaign by the U.S. Navy in Vietnam
- Starlite (1965) — United States Marine Corps actions near Chu Lai.
- Sunrise (1962) (South Vietnam) — Relocation of Vietnamese peasantry around Saigon to "strategic hamlets."
- Tailwind (1970) (United States) — Alleged use of nerve gas against U.S. defectors in Laos.
- Toan Thang 42 (1970) (South Vietnam) — ARVN incursion into Cambodia
- Union I and II (1967) (United States) — American Marines in the Quế Sơn Valley.
  - March–April 1958: Operation Booster Shot, nationwide
  - 22 January 1959 – 19 April 1961: Project Hotfoot (Laos), nationwide
  - December 1958: North Vietnamese invasion of Laos, in Military Region 3 (MR 3)
  - 25 December 1959: 1960 Laotian coups, in Military Region 5 (M5)
  - 10 August 1960: 1960 Laotian coups, in MR 5
  - 13–16 December 1960: Battle of Vientiane, in MR 5
  - 17 January 1961 – 30 September 1974: Operation Momentum, in Military Region 2 (MR 2)
  - 31 January – 6 June 1961: Battle of Ban Pa Dong, in Military Region 1 (MR 1)
  - 13 March – August 1961: Operation Millpond, nationwide, (cancelled)
  - 13 December 1961 – 10 September 1962: Operation Pincushion, in Military Region 4 (MR 4)
  - January – 5 May 1962: Battle of Luang Namtha, in MR 1
  - 25 May 1963: Chinese Road in MR 1
  - Summer 1963 – 1972: Operation Hardnose, in MR 3 and MR 4
  - November 1963 – January 1964: Battle of Lak Sao, in MR 3
  - Late 1963 – mid-1967: Wapi Project, in MR 4
  - 18 April 1964: 1964 Laotian coups, in MR 5
  - 19–29 July 1964: Operation Triangle, in MR1, MR2, and MR 5
  - 19 July 1964 – March 1973: Unity (military operation), in MR 2 and MR 4
  - 4 August 1964: 1964 Laotian coups, in MR 5
  - 14 December 1964 – 22 February 1973: Operation Barrel Roll, in MR 2
  - 31 January 1965: 1965 Laotian coups, in MR 5
  - 3 April 1965 –11 November 1968: Operation Steel Tiger in MR 3 and MR 4
  - Late 1965: Operation Star (Laos), in MR 3
  - 5 December 1965 – end of 1968: Operation Tiger Hound in MR 3 and MR 4
  - 17 February 1966: Battles of Nakhang, in MR 2
  - 23 May 1966: Second Battle of Nakhang, in MR 2
  - August 1966 – January 1968: Battle of Nam Bac, in MR 1
  - 21 October 1966: 1966 Laotian coup, in MR 5
  - 6 January 1967: Third Battle of Nakhang, in MR 2
  - 9 January 1967: Ban Naden raid, in MR 3
  - 29 July – 1 August 1967: 1967 Opium War, on Burmese border of MR 1
  - 23 January 1968: Battle of Ban Houei Sane, in MR 3
  - 10–11 March 1968: Battle of Lima Site 85, in MR 2
  - 26 November 1968 – 7 January 1969: Operation Pigfat, in MR 2
  - 28 February 1969: Fourth Battle of Nakhang, in MR 2
  - 17 March – 7 April 1969: Operation Raindance, in MR2
  - 12 March 1969: Battles of Bouamlong, in MR 2
  - 18–27 June 1969: Campaign Toan Thang, in MR 2
  - 21–26 June 1969: Operation Left Jab in MR 4
  - 1–15 July 1969: Operation Off Balance, in MR 2
  - 28 July – 17 October 1969: Operation Junction City Jr., in MR 3
  - 6 August – 30 September 1969: Kou Kiet, in MR 2
  - 13 September 1969 – 25 April 1970: Campaign 139, in MR 2
  - 20 September 1969 – 9 March 1970: Operation Diamond Arrow, in MR 4
  - 15 November 1968 – 29 March 1969: Operation Commando Hunt, in MR 3 and MR 4
  - 2–26 July 1970: Operation Maeng Da, in MR 3
  - 31 August – mid-December 1970: Operation Honorable Dragon, in MR 4
  - 11–13 September 1970: Operation Tailwind, in MR 4
  - 26 September 1970 – 7 January 1971: Operation Counterpunch, in MR 2
  - 19 October – 13 November 1970: Tchepone Operation, in MR 3
  - 1 January – May 1971: Project Copper, in MR 4
  - 5 January – 11 February 1971: Operation Silver Buckle, in MR 3
  - 2 February – late May 1971: Campaign 74B, in MR 2
  - 8 February – 25 March 1971: Operation Lam Son 719, in MR 4
  - 16 February – 29 March 1971: Operation Desert Rat, in MR 3
  - 2 April – 20 August 1971: Operation Phalat, along Thai border of MR 1
  - 7 April – 27 June 1971: Operation Xieng Dong, in MR 1
  - 15 May – late September 1971: Operation Phoutah, in MR 3
  - 9–11 June 1971: Operation Phiboonpol, in MR 4
  - 27 July – 31 October 1971: Operation Sayasila, in MR 4
  - 5 August – 25 September 1971: Phou Khao Kham, in MR 5
  - September 1971: Operation Sourisak Montry, along Thai border of MR 1
  - 1–9 November 1971: Operation Bedrock (Laos), in MR 4
  - 1 November – 23 December 1971: Operation Thao La, in MR 4
  - 17 December 1971 – 30 January 1972: Campaign Z, in MR 2
  - 30 December 1971 – 16 March 1972: Operation Maharat, in MR 1 and MR 5
  - 1 February – 17 March 1972, Operation Strength I, in MR 2
  - 11 February – ca. 31 March 1972, Operation Sinsay in MR 4
  - 6–30 March 1972: Operation Strength II, in MR 2
  - 1–27 April 1972: Operation Fa Ngum, in MR 4
  - June 1972: Operation Sourisak Montry VIII, along Thai border of MR 1
  - 15 June – 19 October 1972: Operation Black Lion, in MR 4
  - 26 July – 27 September 1972: Operation Phou Phiang II, in MR 2
  - 18 October 1972 – 22 February 1973: Operation Black Lion III, in MR 4
  - 28 October – 27 December 1972: Campaign 972, on the MR2/MR 3 boundary
  - 21 November 1972 – 22 February 1973: Operation Black Lion V, in MR 4
  - 7 December 1972 – early May 1973: The Vinh wiretap
  - 6 January – 5 February 1973: Operation Maharat II, in MR 5
  - 18 January – March 1973: Operation Phou Phiang III, in MR 2
  - 20 August 1973: 1973 Laotian coup, in MR 5

== Post–Cold War ==
=== Asia ===
- Safed Sager (1999) (India) — Indian Air Force operations in the Kargil War.
- Operation Swift Retort (2019) — Pakistan Air Force retaliatory air operation during the 2019 conflict with India.
- Operation Sindoor (2025) (India) — Indian missile strikes on Pakistan in response to the Pahalgam terrorist attack

=== Sri Lankan Civil War ===
- Vadamarachchi Operation (1997) (Sri Lanka) — military offensive carried out by the Sri Lankan military
- Operation Riviresa (1995) (Sri Lanka) — operation launched by the Sri Lankan Armed Forces to capture the Jaffna Peninsula.
- Operation Jayasikurui (1997–1999) (Sri Lanka) —
- 2008–2009 Sri Lankan Army Northern offensive (2008–2009) (Sri Lanka) — Final major operation of the country's 25-year-old civil war.
- Jaffna University Helidrop (1987) (India) — First of the operations launched by the Indian forces (IPKF) aimed at disarming the Liberation Tigers of Tamil Eelam (LTTE) by force and securing the town of Jaffna.
- Operation Pawan (1987) (India) — Indian mission to take control of Jaffna

=== Rwanda ===
- Clean Corridor (1994) — Escort of Tutsi military forces to Kigali by the United Nations Assistance Mission for Rwanda (UNAMIR).
- Green Beam (1990) (Belgium) — Belgian military evacuation of civilians in Rwanda.
- Ippocampo (1994) (Italy) — Italian codename for evacuation of Italian civilians from Rwanda.
- Noroît (1990) (France) — French codename for evacuation of civilians from Kigali at the start of the Rwandan Civil War.
- Silver Back (1994) (Belgium) — Belgian military evacuation of civilians and withdrawal of Belgian armed forces in Rwanda.
- Tamar (1994) (Australia) (United Nations) — Australian contribution to peacekeeping in Rwanda.
- Turquoise (1994) (France) — French led intervention in Rwanda to protect displaced persons.

=== Congo/Zaire ===
- Antilope (1997) (France) — French Army evacuation of French and foreign citizens from Pointe-Noire.
- Artemis (2003) (European Union) (United Nations) — French led EU contribution to UN peace keeping mission during Ituri conflict, Democratic Republic of Congo (MONUSCO).
- Blue Beam (1991) (Belgium) — Belgian military intervention and evacuation of civilians in Zaire.
- Caravan (2003) (Canada) — Canadian contribution to the French-led Interim Emergency Multinational Force in the Democratic Republic of Congo.
- Green Stream (1997) (Belgium) — Belgian military evacuation of civilians in Zaire.
- Malebo (1996) (France) — French Army hostage rescue operation in Zaire.
- Mistral (2003) (South Africa) — South African contribution to the Mission of the United Nations in the Democratic Republic of the Congo (MONUC) including the Force Intervention Brigade.
- Pélican (1997) (France) — French Army evacuation of French and foreign citizens from Brazzaville.
- Teutonic (2005) (South Africa) — SANDF assistance to DRC transitional government.

=== Horn of Africa ===
- Addition (2000) — Canada's contribution to the United Nations Mission in Ethiopia and Eritrea (UNMEE).
- Atalanta (2008–present) (European Union) — EU military presence off the coast of Somalia to act against piracy.
- Deliverance (1993) (Canada) (United Nations) — Canadian mission to Somalia.
- Eastern Exit (1991) (United States) — US evacuation of its embassy in Somalia.
- Espresso (2002) (South Africa) — South African contribution to the United Nations Mission in Ethiopia and Eritrea (UNMEE).
- Operation Gothic Serpent (1993) — United States special operation with the primary mission of capturing faction leader Mohamed Farrah Aidid in Somalia.
- Iskoutir (1992–1999) (France) — French Army intervention for enforcement of ceasefire during and after the Djiboutian Civil War.
- Restore Hope (1992) (United States) (United Nations) — American name for UNITAF, humanitarian intervention in Somalia.
  - Oryx (1992–1993) (France) — French Army contribution to Operation Restore Hope.
- Solace (1992) (Australia) (United Nations) — Australian deployment in Somalia.

=== Mano River Region ===
- Barras (2000) (United Kingdom) — Rescue of British hostages/soldiers and SAS destruction of a rebel group in Sierra Leone.
- Espadon (1997) (France) — French codename for evacuation of French civilians during Sierra Leone Civil War.
- Licorne (2002) (France) — French Army contribution to the United Nations Operation in Côte d'Ivoire.
- Montego (2003) (South Africa) — South African contribution to United Nations Mission in Liberia (UNMIL).
- Phillis (2004) (United Kingdom) — Evacuation of British citizens from Ivory Coast.
- Providence (2003) (France) — French codename for evacuation of French and foreign civilians from Monrovia during Second Liberian Civil War.
- Sharp Edge (1990–1991) (United States) — Evacuation of Americans from Liberia.
- Shining Express (2003) (United States) — Evacuation of Americans from Liberia.

=== Central Africa ===
- African Union Mission in Burundi (2003–2004) (South Africa) (Mozambique) (Ethiopia) — African Union mission to Burundi, later replaced by United Nations Operation in Burundi.
- Boali (2002–2013) (France) — French intervention in the Central African Republic during the Central African Republic Bush War. It is replaced by Operation Sangharis.
- EUFOR Tchad/RCA (2007–2009) (European Union) — French led EU peace keeping mission in Chad and Central African Republic during Chadian Civil War.
- MINURCAT (2009–2010) (United Nations) — UN mission that succeeded EUFOR Tchad/RCA.
- Sangaris (2013–2016) (France) — Peace-keeping intervention in Central African Republic.

=== Libya ===
- Unified Protector (2011) — NATO led intervention during the Libyan Civil War to enforce United Nations Security Council Resolution 1973.
  - Ellamy (2011) (United Kingdom) — British contribution to the operation Unified Protector.
  - Harmattan (2011) (France) — French contribution to the operation Unified Protector.
  - Mobile (2011) (Canada) — Canadian contribution to the operation Unified Protector.
  - Odyssey Dawn (2011) (United States) — US contribution to the operation Unified Protector.

=== Sudan ===
- Azure (2005) (Australia) (United Nations) — Australian name for UN peace keeping mission in Sudan (UNMIS).
- Cordite (2004) (South Africa) — South African observer mission to the African Union mission in Darfur.
- Nilo (2005) (Italy) (United Nations) — Italian name for UN peace keeping mission in Sudan (UNMIS).

=== Western Sahara ===
- Lamantin (1977–1978) (France) — French Army intervention in Mauritania during the Western Sahara conflict.
- MINURSO (1991–present) (United Nations) — UN peace keeping mission in Western Sahara.

=== Zimbabwe ===
- Liberation (2002) — Seizure of Asian-owned assets in Zimbabwe.
- Murambatsvina (2005) — Zimbabwe government's attack on residential district loyal to opposition groups.

=== Other Africa ===
- Albatros (1993–94) (Italy) (United Nations) — Italian contribution to UN peace keeping mission in Mozambique (UNOMOZ).
- Azalée (1995) (France) — French reaction to the mercenary led coup in Comoros.
- Boleas (1998) (South Africa) (Botswana) — South African and Botswanan military intervention in Lesotho.
- Corymbe (1990–present) (France) — French Navy prepositioning off Gulf of Guinea acting against piracy and serving as backup for a potential evacuation of EU citizens from Western Africa in case of conflict.
- Tanker Two (2002) (South Africa) — South African Navy mission to shadow Greenpeace's MV Esperanza and prevent interception of the Pacific Teal, a plutonium transport.

=== East Timor ===
- Astute (2006) (Australia) — Deployment of Australian military forces to East Timor following the May 2006 civil unrest.
- Citadel — Australia's contribution to the United Nations Mission of Support in East Timor (UNMISET). Later ongoing peacekeeping actions were known as Operation Tanager.
- Chiron (Australia) (Timor-Leste) — Training of East Timorese military forces by the Australian Defence Force.
- Faber — Deployment of United Nations military observers to East Timor in support of the UNAMET-monitored popular consultation.
- Poinciana (1975) (Indonesia) — Or Operasi Flamboyan (a name of a tropical tree); seaborne capture of Dili in 1975.
- Seroja (1975) (Indonesia) — Indonesian invasion of East Timor in 1975.
- Stabilise (Australia) — Also spelled as Operation Stabilize; Australian Defence Force's involvement in the multinational force United Nations International Force in East Timor (INTERFET) in East Timor
- Scorched earth — Or Operasi Sapu Bersih in Indonesian, also known as Operation Clean Sweep; campaign of violence and arson allegedly committed by the TNI-supervised pro-integration militias following the 1999 United Nations supervised plebiscite.
- Spitfire (Australia) — Evacuation of foreign nationals from East Timor by Australian defence assets, as a result of post-referendum violence.
- Toucan — Canada's contribution to the United Nations' International Force in East Timor (INTERFET) and the United Nations Transitional Administration in East Timor (UNTAET)
- Warden — Military operation involving all contributing forces conducted under the multinational peacekeeping mission known as United Nations' International Force in East Timor (INTERFET)

=== Croatian War of Independence 1991–1995 ===
- Operation Otkos 10 (end Oct-Nov 1991) (Croatia) — Croatian actions against Serbian forces on area from Mount Bilogora to Mount Papuk (on west of Slavonia).
- Operation Orkan 91 (1991) (Croatia) — Follow-up Croatian offensive after Otkos 10.
- Harmony (1992) — Canada's contribution to the United Nations Protection Force (UNPROFOR), which was created in February 1992 to ensure the protection and demilitarization of three UN Protected Areas in Croatia.
- Operation Tigar (July 1992) (Croatia) — Croatian military actions in occupied Dubrovnik hinterland, held by Serbian and Montenegrin regulars.
- Medački džep (September 1993) (Croatia) — Croatian offensive against Serbian forces with aim of relieving the city of Gospić from Serb shelling attacks.
- Bljesak ("Flash") (March 1995) (Croatia) — Croatian offensive against Serbian forces, with aim of liberating occupied western Slavonia.
- Oluja ("Storm") (August 1995) (Croatia) — Croatian major offensive against most areas under control of Serbian forces.

=== War in Bosnia and Herzegovina 1992–1995 ===
- Operation Corridor '92 (24 June 1992 – 6 October 1992) (Republika Srpska (1992–1995)) — Bosnian Serb operation against Bosnian Croat forces in Bosnian Posavina.
- Maritime Monitor (July 1992 – November 1992) (NATO) — in support of UN resolutions 713 and 757, operation which subsequently became:
- Sky Monitor (October 1992 – April 1993) (NATO) — Monitoring by NAEW of unauthorized flights in the airspace of Bosnia-Herzegovina during the Bosnian War.
- Maritime Guard (November 1992 – June 1993) (NATO) — in support of UN Resolution 787.
- Balbuzard (January 1993 – December 1995) (France) — French military action aiming to liberate hostages in Sarajevo and ensure the safety of already deployed French elements of UNPROFOR in case of a potential evacuation.
- Deny Flight (April 1993 – December 1995) — NATO operation preventing the violation of the Bosnia-Herzegovina airspace, declared No-Fly Zone.
- Sharp Guard (June 1993 – October 1996) — Co-ordinated WEU and NATO evolution of Operation Maritime Guard in continuing support of UN Resolution 787.
- Neretva '93 (September 1993 – October 1993) (Republic of Bosnia and Herzegovina) — Offensive of Bosnian Muslim forces against Bosnian Croats in northern and eastern Herzegovina.
- Operation Tvigi '94 (24 January 1994) (Croatian Republic of Herzeg-Bosnia) — Bosnian Croat attack on village of Here.
- Bøllebank ("Hooligan-bashing" in Danish) (29 April 1994) (United Nations) — UN-forces' use of tanks against Bosnian Serbian forces.
- Operation Tiger (2 June 1994 – 21 August 1994) (Republic of Bosnia and Herzegovina) — Offensive of pro-government Bosniak forces against forces of Fikret Abdić.
- Amanda (25 October 1994) (United Nations) — Danish UN-forces' second engagement against Bosnian Serbian forces.
- Operation Cincar (20 October 1994 – 3 November 1994) (Croatia) (Croatian Republic of Herzeg-Bosnia) (Republic of Bosnia and Herzegovina) — Joint Bosniak-Croat offensive to take control of Kupres from the VRS.
- Operation Spider (4 November 1994 – Summer 1995) (Republika Srpska (1992–1995)) (Republic of Serbian Krajina) — Republika Srpska and Serbian Krajina offensive in northwestern Bosnia.
- Operation Winter '94 (29 November 1995 – 24 December 1995) (Croatia) (Croatian Republic of Herzeg-Bosnia) — Croatian offensive in Livno area.
- Operation Leap 1 (7 April 1995) (Croatia) (Croatian Republic of Herzeg-Bosnia) — Croatian offensive in Livno-Bosansko Grahovo area.
- Operation Leap 2 (4 June 1995 – 10 June 1995) (Croatia) (Croatian Republic of Herzeg-Bosnia) — Croatian offensive in Livno-Bosansko Grahovo area.
- Operation Krivaja '95 (6 July 1995 – 11 July 1995) (Republika Srpska (1992–1995)) — Bosnian Serb operation to take control of the Srebrenica enclave.
- Operation Stupčanica '95 (25 July 1995 – 26 July 1995) (Republika Srpska (1992–1995)) — Bosnian Serb operation to take control of the Žepa enclave.
- Operation Summer '95 (25 July 1995 – 29 July 1995) (Croatia) — Croatian offensive in western Bosnia.
- Sword '95 (1995) (Bosnia and Herzegovina) — Bosnian Serbian offensive against Bosnian-Muslim forces in western Bosnia.
- Operation Deliberate Force (August – September 1995) — NATO air campaign in Bosnia and Herzegovina.
- Operation Maestral (8 September 1995 – 15 September 1995) (Croatia) (Croatian Republic of Herzeg-Bosnia) — Major Croatian offensive in western Bosnia.
- Operation Sana (13 September 1995 – 13 October 1995) (Republic of Bosnia and Herzegovina) — Bosnian offensive in northwestern Bosnia.
- Operation Una (18 September 1995 – 19 September 1995) (Croatia) — Croatian operation against Bosnian Serb Army.
- Operation Southern Move (8 October 1995 – 11 October 1995) (Croatia) (Croatian Republic of Herzeg-Bosnia) — Croatian offensive in area around Mrkonjić Grad.

=== Bosnia and Herzegovina (Post Bosnian War) ===
- Joint Endeavor (December 1995) — NATO peace-keeping operation in Bosnia and Herzegovina which established IFOR
- Joint Guard (December 1996 – 1998) — NATO peace-keeping operation in Bosnia and Herzegovina which established SFOR
- Joint Forge (1998–2004) — NATO peace-keeping operation in Bosnia and Herzegovina following Operation Joint Guard
- EUFOR Althea (2004–) — European Union peace-keeping operation in Bosnia and Herzegovina following Operation Joint Forge, replacing IFOR and SFOR.

=== Kosovo War 1999 ===
- Allied Force (1999) — NATO's air campaign in Yugoslavia
- Megaphone (2000) — Canada's return of equipment used in Kosovo
- Quadrant (1999–2002) — Canada's mission in Kosovo
- Joint Guardian (1999 – ) — NATO operation which established KFOR

=== Republic of Macedonia ===
- Able Sentry (1993–1994) (United States) — Berlin Brigade deployed as part of Multi-National United Nations Protection Forces (UNPROFOR) to the Republic of Macedonia to establish Camp Able Sentry and monitor sanctions imposed by NATO against Serbia/Kosovo. *This mission was later taken over by the (then) Germany-based, 3rd Infantry Div (Mech).
- Echo (1998–2000) — Canada sending air forces to Aviano, Italy to enforce a no-fly zone over Balkan region (UNSFOR and UNKFOR).
- Essential Harvest (2001) — month-long NATO mission of disarming ethnic Albanians in the Republic of Macedonia.
  - Forage (2001–2002) (Canada) — Canadian contribution to NATO's Essential Harvest.
- Kinetic (1999–2000) — Canada's contribution to NATO's mission KFOR to secure Kosovo and the Republic of Macedonia and to provide humanitarian needs to displaced persons.

=== Haiti ===
- Constable (1997) — Canada's contribution to the United Nations Mission in Haiti
- Uphold Democracy (1994–1995) (United States) (Poland) (Argentina) — U.S. led multinational intervention aimed at removing the military regime after the 1991 coup in Haiti. This operation was later replaced by UNMIH.
- New Horizon (1995–1996) (United States) — U.S. mission in support (and under the command) of United Nations Mission in Haiti
- Secure Tomorrow (2004) (United States) (Canada) (France) (Chile) — US led multinational force, authorized by the UN as the Multinational Interim Force (MIF) which was replaced by the MINUSTAH.
  - Carbet (2004) (France) — French codename for peace-keeping intervention in Haiti.
- MINUSTAH (2004–present) — United Nations peace-keeping presence in Haiti.

=== Persian Gulf War ===
- Desert Shield (1990–1991) (United States) — American buildup prior to Gulf War
  - Busiris (1990–1991) (France) — Presence of French Army elements stationed in the UAE as deterrent against potential Iraqi Army action
  - Salamandre (1990–1991) (France) — Deployment of French Army in preparation of operations Busiris and Daguet.
- Desert Storm (1991) — Gulf War
  - Artimon (France) — French Navy enforcement of UN resolutions 661 and 665 during the Gulf War
  - Daguet ("Brocket deer") (France) — French codename for operations during the Gulf War
  - Damask (Australia) — Royal Australian Navy deployment to the Persian Gulf.
  - Desert Sabre — The ground campaign which began on 24 February 1991.
  - Granby (United Kingdom) — British codename for operations during the Gulf War
  - Locusta ("Locust") (Italy) — Italian codename for operations during the Gulf War.
  - Phèdre (France) — French Navy codename for surveillance of Suez Canal.
- Ace Guard (1991) — (NATO) Allied Command Europe Mobile Force for Turkey South Border Reinforcement (based at Diyarbakir AFB)

=== Iraq (post-Gulf War) ===
- Provide Comfort (1991–1996) (United States) (United Kingdom) (France) (Australia) (Netherlands) (Italy) — Security and humanitarian aid to Kurds in northern Iraq and No-Fly Zone North of 36°N over Iraq.
  - Airone (1991) (Italy) — Italian codename for Operation Provide Comfort.
  - Haven (1991) (United Kingdom) — Security and humanitarian aid to Kurds in Northern Iraq.
  - Libage (1991) (France) — French codename for Operation Provide Comfort in the Turkey-Iraq border area.
  - Ramure (1991) (France) — French codename for Operation Provide Comfort in the Iran-Iraq border area.
- Record (1991–2001) (Canada) — Canadian mission to secure Iraqi-Kuwaiti border.
- Southern Watch (1991–2003) (France) (Saudi Arabia) (United Kingdom) (United States) (United Nations) — No-Fly Zone South of 33°N over Iraq.
  - Alysse (1992–2003) (France) — French codename for contribution to Operation Southern Watch.
  - Bolton (1997–2001) (United Kingdom) — UK Royal Air Force Contribution to Southern Watch.
  - Resinate South (2001–2003) (United Kingdom) — UK Contribution to Southern Watch including Response Options.
- Southern Breeze (1991) (France) (Belgium) (Netherlands) — Demining operations of Kuwaiti waters.
- Desert Strike (1996) (United States) — retaliation attacks on Iraq.
- Determination (1998) (Canada) — Canadian deployment in the Persian Gulf to force Iraq to comply with United Nations inspection agreements.
- Northern Watch (1997–2003) (Turkey) (United Kingdom) (United States) (United Nations) — No-Fly Zone North of 36°N over Iraq.
  - Resinate North (2001–2003) (United Kingdom) — UK Contribution to Northern Watch including Response Options.
- Desert Fox (1998) (United Kingdom) (United States) — Bombing campaign on military Iraqi targets.
- Desert Falcon (1991–2003) United States PATRIOT missile defense of Saudi Arabia, Kuwait and Israel from the Iraqi Scud missile threat.

=== Georgia ===
- Russo-Georgian War (2008) Russia — military operation repelling Georgian attack on South Ossetia
- Operation Clear Field (2008) Georgia — Failed Attempt to Capture Tskhinvali

=== Armenia (First Nagorno-Karabakh War) ===
- Wedding in the Mountains (1992) (Armenia) — Invasion of the town of Shusha of Azerbaijan by the Armenian Armed Forces during the First Nagorno-Karabakh War

=== Middle East ===
- Blow to the Head (2010) (Yemen) (Saudi Arabia) — operation against the militants in the insurgent Yemeni town of Sa'dah in the Saada Governorate.
- Scorched Earth (2009) (Yemen) (Saudi Arabia) — was the code-name of a Yemeni military offensive in the northern Saada Governorate .
- Baliste (2006) (France) — French codename for evacuation of EU civilians during Lebanon War.
- Diapason (1994) (France) — French codename for evacuation of EU civilians during the Yemeni Civil War.
- Musketeer (1956) (France) (United Kingdom) (Israel) — Tripartite operation aiming at gaining control of Suez Canal and removing Gamal Abdel Nasser from power in Egypt.

== Global War on Terrorism and other associated activity ==
=== Afghanistan War ===
- Enduring Freedom – Afghanistan (2001–2014) (NATO) ISAF — US led invasion of Afghanistan following the September 11 attacks, aiming to attack al-Qaeda and deny it a safe haven in Afghanistan by removing the Taliban from power.
  - Arès (2003–2007) (France) — French Special Forces contribution to the operation Enduring Freedom.
  - Épidote (2002–2014) (France) — French Army training of Afghan Army officers.
  - Héraclès (2001–2002) (France) — French Navy contribution to the initial phase of operation Enduring Freedom.
  - Pamir (2001–2014) (France) — French Land Army contribution to the operation Enduring Freedom.
- Freedom's Sentinel (2015–2021) (NATO) RSM — Afghan and US led counterterrorism operations against the remnants of Al-Qaeda in Afghanistan
- Resolute Support (2015–2021) RSM — NATO-led training, advising, and assistance mission in the Islamic Republic of Afghanistan.
- Operation Allied Welcome (2021–present) — Evacuation of US citizens, green card holders, Special Immigrant VISA holders, and their families.

=== Iraq War ===
- New Dawn (2010–2011)
- Iraqi Freedom (2003–2011) (United States) (United Kingdom) (Australia) (Poland) — US led invasion of Iraq under the claim that Saddam Hussein was producing WMDs.
  - See Iraq Operations Since 2003

=== Sahel ===
- Serval (2013) (France) — French intervention in Mali to counter AQIM progress.
- Barkhane (2014) (France) — French counter-terrorism activities in Sahel region to eradicate AQIM presence.
- Rijke (2015) (France) — Unconfirmed codename for rescue mission of Dutch hostage Sjaak Rijke detained in Mali since 2011.

=== Syrian War ===
- Chammal (2014–present) (France) — French airstrikes in Iraq and Syria to disrupt ISIS progress.
- Timber Sycamore (2012–present) (United States) — US and Jordan funding, training and arms supply program to support Syrian rebel forces in Syrian Civil War.
- Operation Shader (2014–present) (United Kingdom) — UK operations in Iraq and Syria to counter ISIS.
- Operation Shah Euphrates (2015) (Turkey)
- Operation Euphrates Shield (2016–2017) (Turkey)
- Turkish military operation in Idlib Governorate (2017–present) (Turkey)
- Operation Olive Branch (2018–2019) (Turkey) — Turkish offensive in Syria against the PYD and the YPG.
- Operation Peace Spring (2019) (Turkey)
- Operation Spring Shield (2020) (Turkey)

=== War in North West Pakistan ===
- Operation al-Mizan (2002–2006) (Pakistan) — Pakistani military operation against Taliban terrorists and their affiliates.
- Operation Sunrise (2007) (Pakistan) — Pakistani military operation against Islamic fundamentalists in Lal Masjid ("Red Mosque") and the Jamia Hafsa complex in Islamabad.
- "Operation Rah-e-Haq (Operation Rightful Path) (2007) (Pakistan) — Pakistani military operation against Taliban terrorists and their affiliates.
- "Operation Zalzala (Operation Earthquake)" (Pakistan) (2008) — Pakistani military operation against Taliban terrorists and their affiliates.
- "Operation Sirat-e-Mustaqeem (Operation Righteous Path)" (2008) (Pakistan) — Pakistani military operation against Taliban terrorists and their affiliates.
- "Operation Sherdil (Operation Lionheart)" (2008-2009) (Pakistan) — Pakistani military operation against Taliban terrorists and their affiliates.
- "Operation Tor Tander (Operation Black Thunderstorm)" (2009) (Pakistan) — Pakistani military operation against Taliban terrorists and their affiliates.
- "Operation Rah-e-Nijat (Operation Path to Salvation)" (2009) (Pakistan) — Pakistani military operation against Taliban terrorists and their affiliates.
- "Operation Janbaz (Operation Powerful)" (2009) (Pakistan) — Pakistani military operation against Taliban terrorists and their affiliates.
- "Operation Rah-e-Rast (Operation Right Path)" (2009–2010) (Pakistan) — Pakistani military operation against Taliban terrorists and their affiliates
- "Operation Khwakh Ba De Sham (Operation 'I will teach you a lesson')" (2009-2011) (Pakistan) — Pakistani military operation against Taliban terrorists and their affiliates.
- "Operation Brekhna (Operation Thunder)" (2009-2012) (Pakistan) — Pakistani military operation against Taliban terrorists and their affiliates.
- "Operation Koh-e-Sufaid (Operation White Mountain) (2011) (Pakistan) — Pakistani military operation against Taliban terrorists and their affiliates.
- "Operation Rah-e-Shahadat (Operation Path to Martyrdom)" (2013) (Pakistan) — Pakistani military operation against Taliban terrorists and their affiliates.
- "Operation Zarb-e-Azb (Operation Prophet's Sword)" (2014-2017) (Pakistan) — Pakistani military operation against Taliban terrorists and their affiliates.
- "Operation Khyber 1,2,3,4 (Khyber 1,2,3,4)" (2014–2017) (Pakistan) — Pakistani military operation in Khyber agency and surrounding areas against Taliban terrorists and their affiliates.
- "Operation Radd-ul-Fasaad (Operation Rejection of Strife)" (2017-2024) (Pakistan) — Pakistani military operation against Taliban terrorists and their affiliates.
- "Operation Azm-e-Istehkam (Operation Resolve for Stability)" (2024-) (Pakistan) — Pakistani military operation against Taliban terrorists and their affiliates.

=== Other military counter-terrorist operations ===
- Eagle Assist (2001) — Surveillance and protection of US skies by NATO military aircraft.
- Noble Eagle (2001) — US military operations to prevent terrorism in the United States.
- Enduring Freedom – Kyrgyzstan (2001)
- Enduring Freedom – Horn of Africa (2002) US military operations and civic assistance based in Djibouti.
- Enduring Freedom – Philippines (2002) US military operations in the Philippines against Abu Sayyaf insurgents.
- Enduring Freedom – Pankisi Gorge (2002)
- Enduring Freedom – Trans Sahara (2007) US military operations against terrorists in the Sahara/Sahel region of Africa.
- Enduring Freedom – Caribbean and Central America (2008)

=== Terrorist operations ===
- Bojinka (1995) — Aborted Al-Qaeda plot to bomb eleven aircraft over Asia, and/or assassinate Pope John Paul II in the Philippines.
- Jibril (2001) — Aborted Jemaah Islamiah plan to bomb US, Australian, Israeli and British targets in Singapore. Also known as Operation C.
- Death Trains (2004) — Unverified name given by Al-Qaeda for the Madrid train bombings.
- Wagon (2003) — Unverified name given by Al-Qaeda for an aborted plan to bomb the London Underground and attack Heathrow Airport.
- Black Tornado (2008) — Name given to the Mumbai shooting and bombing attacks perpetrated by Lashkar-e-Taiba.

=== Counter-terrorism drills ===
- Fast Forward (2005) Mock evacuation of downtown Washington.
- Firework Fanfare (2005) Mock evacuation of towns in Oklahoma.
- Highline (2005) Counter-terrorist exercise in Collingwood, Melbourne.
- Operation Red Dragon (2009) Training of military and civil medical and other units in response to a mock chemical attack on a sporting event.
- TriPOD (2004) Plan to mass inoculate New York City citizens in the event of a biological attack.

=== Preventive counter-terrorist operations ===
- Active Endeavour — NATO naval forces in the Mediterranean.
  - Sirius (2005) (Canada) — Canadian military participation in Operation Active Endeavour.
- Asparagus — Investigation and arrest into suspected Islamist terrorists in Belgium by Belgian police.
- Atlas (2003) — counter-terrorism initiatives implemented by the New York Police Department.
- Crevice (2004) — British counterterrorism action.
- Green Quest (2001) — US Customs anti-money laundering operations targeting Al-Barakat transactions.
- Kratos (2002) — Development and implementation of "shoot-to-kill" anti-terrorist policies by the London Metropolitan Police.
- Laverda (2003) — London Metropolitan Police surveillance operations against Islamist demonstrations.
- Liberty Shield (2003) — Department of Homeland Security operations to enhance security at US installations, and to detain selected foreign nationals.
- NYShield (2003) — New York state plan to secure transport centres and nodes.
- Safe Commerce (2004) — Implementation of new measures and technology to improve maritime cargo screening.
- Sentinelle (2015–present) (France) — Deployment of military troops on French territory following terror attacks.
- Vigilance (2001) — Counter-terrorist operations conducted by the state of Arizona.

=== Reactive counter-terrorist operations ===
- Alliance (2002) — Australian and Indonesian joint investigations into the 2002 Bali bombings.
- Bali Assist (2002) — Australian evacuation of killed and injured foreign nationals from Indonesia after the 2002 Bali bombings.
- Seal (2004) — Arrest of suspected Islamist militants in Spain following the Madrid train bombings.
- Support (September 11–14, 2001) — Canadian Forces operations after the September 11, 2001 attacks
- Tigris (2004) — Spanish investigations into Islamist organisations in Spain.
- Yellow Ribbon (2001) — Transport Canada's operations after the September 11, 2001 attacks

=== Other/Unknown ===
- Abacus (Canada) — Plan to use the Canadian Forces to maintain and restore vital public services in the event of disruption by the Year 2000 problem.
- Artisan (Canada) — Canadian Forces contribution to the Rinas Airfield Rehabilitation Project in Tirana, Albania.
- Breakwater (2006) (Australia) — Australian air and sea operation targeting border incursions by foreign fishing boats off its northern coastline.
- Bright Star (1981) (United States) — American exercise to reinforce allies in the middle east.
- Chaperon — Canada's contribution to the United Nations of one military observer to the United Nation Mission of Observers in Prevlaka (UNMOP).
- Celesta — Australian naval surveillance in Australia's southern waters against illegal fishing.
- Cranberry — Australian naval surveillance in Australia's northern waters against smuggling and illegal fishing.
- Eclipse (Canada) — Deployment of Canadian soldiers to east Africa in support of the United Nations Mission in Ethiopia and Eritrea (UNMEE).
- Flavius (1988) (United Kingdom) — SAS action against the IRA in Gibraltar.
- Fusion (2003) — Canada's combined contribution to Allied Harmony and Concordia.
- Garden Plot (United States) — US Army plan for assistance to civil authorities.
- Héphaïstos (1986–present) (France) — French Army support to forest firefighting activities during summers.
- Highjump (1947) (United States) — US Naval expedition to Antarctica.
- Neptune Spear (2011) (United States) — US Navy SEALs operation that killed Osama bin Laden.
- Nunalivut (2006) (Canada) — Canadian naval deployment in the Arctic.
- Parabellum (2007) (Italy) — Italian Mafia-Iraq arms deal investigation.
- Power Geyser (2005) (United States) — Military security support to the 2005 Presidential inauguration.
- Prudence (1999–1999) — Canada's participation in the Mission des Nations Unies dans la République Centrafricaine (MINURCA).
- Relex (2001) — Australian defence force operations to secure Australia's northern maritime approaches against illegal immigration. Reactivated in 2004 as Operation Relex II.
- Sure Victory (1997) (Sri Lanka) — Sri Lankan counter-insurgency operations against the Tamil Tigers.
- Exercise Unified Spirit — Large NATO exercise held every two years to train the armed forces of member nations in joint and combined operations.
- Operation Vijay (1999) (India) — Indian operations against Pakistan during the Kargil war

== Law enforcement ==
=== Other anti-narcotic operations ===
- Century (1996) — ill-fated Essex police / Royal Ulster Constabulary operation to pressure persons of interest for information about a drug-related triple murder.
- Corona (2001) — Miami police operations against heroin trafficking by the Latin Kings.
- Falcon (2004) — anti-pedophilia raid against companies handling credit card payments.
- Final Count (2001) — Miami police operations against heroin trafficking by the John Aragon Heroin Organization.
- Web Tryp (2004) — American sting operation against sellers of psychedelics online.
- Mocha (2005) — New South Wales and federal police investigation into drug smuggling at Sydney airport.
- Outta Towner (2005) — Chicago police operations against heroin trafficking.
- Panzer (1998) — Australian National Crime Authority investigation into organised crime by outlaw motorcycle gangs (bikies).
- Safe Streets (2002) — Anti-drug trafficking operations by Philadelphia police.
- Topaz (2004) — United Nations convened operations against drug-smuggling in Central Asia.
- Operation Bayonet (2017) — Multinational effort to take down darknet site AlphaBay among others.

=== Anti-child pornography operations ===
- Auxin (2004) — Australian anti-child pornography effort.
- Pin (2003) — British-led anti-child pornography effort.

=== Operations against intellectual property theft ===
- Buccaneer (2001) — International raid on unauthorized software distribution.
- D-Elite (2005) — US raid on software infringement operations.
- Fastlink (2004) — International operation against illegally copied computer software.
- Site Down (2005) — International effort against illegally distributed films.

=== Other operations ===
- Ill Wind (1986–89) — FBI investigation into defense contractor bribery and fraud.
- Fast Forward (2005) — Mock evacuation of downtown Washington.
- Falcon (2005) — Widespread dragnet led by the United States Marshals Service.
- Gunrunner (2005–present) — A United States Bureau of Alcohol, Tobacco, Firearms and Explosives (ATF) project to stop the flow of firearms into Mexico, to deprive drug cartels of weapons.
  - Wide Receiver (2006–2008) — A failed sting operation in which ATF attempted allowed guns to travel to Mexico in an attempt to track them to drug lords. The plan failed, and most guns were lost as they moved into Mexico.
  - Fast and Furious (2009–2011) — A similar operation that caused a scandal when guns allowed to "walk" were used in several violent crimes.
- Jackdraw (2004) — London Metropolitan Police operations to prevent and deter pickpocketing.
- Last Call (2005) Texas operation aimed against drunkenness in bars.
- Midas (2003) — Australian anti-money laundering operations by AUSTRAC.
- Midnight Jackal (2009) Pakistani coup attempt
- Minstead (1998) — Metropolitan police operation directed at a serial rapist.
- Olympic Games (2008) Joint Israeli/American software attack on Iranian nuclear facilities.
- Perseus (1998) — British Transit Police.
- Purana (2003) — Investigation of Melbourne, Victoria's underworld.
- Sundevil (1999) — Nationwide United States Secret Service crackdown on illegal computer hacking activities.
- Swamp 81 (1981) — Metropolitan police operation that may have sparked the Brixton riots.
- Trident (1998) — Crackdown by London's Metropolitan Police against drug-related gun crime in the black community. Later expanded to Operation Trafalgar.
- Thermcon (1987) — FBI operation that targeted environmental activists.
- Anaconda (2002–2008) (France) — French Army operation against illegal gold mining in French Guiana.
- Tassergal (2007) (France) — French Army operation against illegal fishing in French Guiana waters.
- Harpie (2008–2016) (France) — French Army operation against illegal gold mining. Successor of Opération Anaconda.
- Temperer (2017) — British Prime Minister Theresa May deployed armed forces on city streets in response to the Manchester Arena Bombing and the subsequent raising of the terror threat level from 'Severe' to 'Critical'.
- Varsity Blues (2019) — FBI investigation into college admissions fraud

See also:

== Humanitarian operations ==
- Ezra and Nehemiah (aka Ali Baba) (1950–1952) — Mass migration/airlift of Iraqi Jews from Iraq to Israel.
- Central (1998) — Canada's assistance to Central America after the devastation of Hurricane Mitch.
- Anode (2000) (Australia) — Australian military contribution as part of the Regional Assistance Mission to the Solomon Islands.
- Assistance (1997) (Canada) — Canadian assistance to Manitoba after major flooding of the Red River.
- Hajji Baba (1952) — United States assistance to Hajj pilgrims.
- Helpem Fren (2000) — Pidgin for helping friend, multinational assistance to the Solomon Islands under the aegis of RAMSI.
- Hawkeye (20 September 1989 – 17 November 1989) — Canada's assistance to St. Croix, U.S. Virgin Islands after the devastation of Hurricane Hugo.
- Navy Help Darwin (1974) (Australia) — Australian Naval assistance to Darwin after Cyclone Tracy.
- Pakistan Assist (2005) (Australia) — Australian Defence Force humanitarian operations providing support after the 2005 Kashmir earthquake.
- Peregrine (2003) (Canada) — British Columbia forest fire fighting assistance by soldiers.
- Persistence (1998) (Canada) — Canadian operation at Peggys Cove, Nova Scotia to recover bodies after crash of SwissAir Flight 111.
- Pyramid (1996) (Canada) — Victoria, British Columbia Canadian Army Reserve assistance by soldiers after heavy snowstorm (1 metre deep) in Victoria, British Columbia.
- Recuperation (1998) — Canadian assistance after major snowstorms in eastern Canada.
- Sumatra Assist (2005) (Australia) — Australian Defence Force humanitarian operations following the 2005 Nias–Simeulue earthquake.
- Torrent (1999) (Canada) — Canadian assistance after the 1999 İzmit earthquake in Turkey.
- Lichi (2000) (South Africa) — South African rescue operations in Mozambique after major flooding due to Cyclone Eline.
- 2004 Indian Ocean earthquake
  - Tsunami Assist (Australia)
  - Sea Wave (India) which included:
    - Mother (mainland relief)
    - Mandat (Andaman and Nicobar Islands)
    - Rainbow (Sri Lanka)
    - Castor (Maldives)
    - Ghambir (Indonesia)
- Dorca (2004) (France) — French assistance in Darfur.
- Unison (2005) (Canada) — Canadian response to Hurricane Katrina.

== Other ==
- Timeline of United States military operations
- List of amphibious assault operations
- List of nuclear tests
- Project Daedalus (British Interplanetary Society study to create a plausible design for an interstellar probe)
- Project Longshot
- Project Jennifer (1974 CIA lifting of a sunken Soviet submarine)
- Project RAND
- Project Vanguard
- Norwegian military operations abroad

== Non-military operations ==
- Bojinka — terrorist plot by al-Qaida members Ramzi Yousef and Khalid Shaikh Mohammed, foiled in 1995
- Clambake — anti-Scientology
- Red Dog — Foiled invasion of Dominica by KKK-aligned white-supremacist mercenaries

== Bibliography ==
- Conboy, Kenneth and James Morrison (1995). Shadow War: The CIA's Secret War in Laos. Paladin Press. ISBN 0-87364-825-0.
