= Roll-up =

Roll-up or Roll Up may refer to:

== Music ==
- "Roll Up" (Emtee song), 2015
- "Roll Up" (Wiz Khalifa song), 2011
- "Roll Up", a song by Fitz and the Tantrums from Fitz and the Tantrums, 2016
- "Roll Up, Roll Up", a song by Streetwalkers from Red Card, 1976

== Computing ==
- Roll-up keyboard, a keyboard that one can roll up into the shape of a cylinder
- Roll-away computer, a theoretical, flexible computer
- Roll-up, an OLAP data operation

== Entertainment ==
- Star Wars Roll-up, a part of the opening sequence of films in the Star Wars franchise
- Roll-up, a type of pin in professional wrestling
- "Roll up", a phrase commonly used by British carnival barkers

== Other ==
- Rollup, a tactic of investors who acquire and then merge similar small companies
- Fruit Roll-Ups, a fruit snack available in the United States of America and in Australia
- Roll-your-own cigarette, a hand-rolled cigarette
- Roll up blind, a type of window covering
- Roll up screen, a screen rolled up from a container and fastened on top of a stick; can be used in campaigning and marketing
- Another term for a wrap
- Roll Up banner, used during the Lambing Flat riots
- Operation Roll-Up, a US refurbishing operation during the Korean War
- Rollups in Blockchain ecosystem are Layer 2 scaling solutions
