= Norwegian military operations abroad =

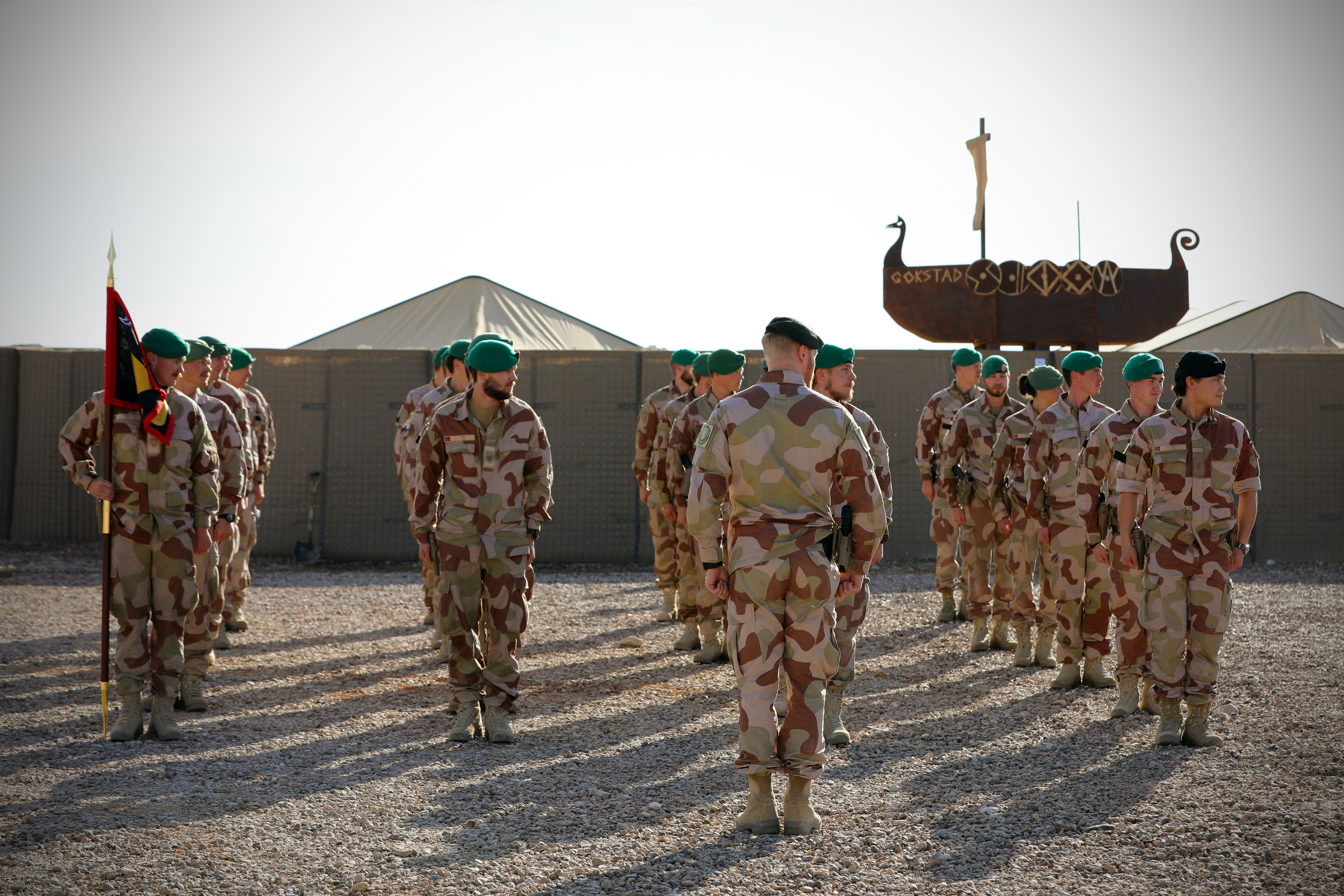
Norwegian soldiers in ceremony at Al Asad Airbase, Iraq in 2021

The Norwegian military have been deployed in countries other than Norway many times, most of them during and after World War II. After 1947, Norway has participated in over 40 military operations abroad and over 120,000 Norwegian troops served in these operations. As of early 2006, 550 Norwegian troops were deployed abroad.

== The constitution of Norway ==
Article 25 of the constitution states:

The King is Commander-in-Chief of the land and naval forces of the Realm. These forces may not be increased or reduced without the consent of the Storting. They may not be transferred to the service of foreign powers, nor may the military forces of any foreign power, except auxiliary forces assisting against hostile attack, be brought into the Realm without the consent of the Storting.

The territorial army and the other troops which cannot be classed as troops of the line must never, without the consent of the Storting, be employed outside the borders of the Realm.

This article also applies to the Air Force. It is not mentioned because Norway did not have an Air Force in 1814. This article has sometimes been quoted by people who do not wish Norway to participate in military operations abroad. They interpret it as outlawing Norwegian troops leaving Norway. However the vast majority of politicians and jurists disagree.

== List of operations ==
This list is not complete. This list is in the order of start year of the operation. Numbers exceeding 1 000 troops are bolded. Numbers exceeding 100 troops are in emphasis.

Country/Area, Conflict/Operation, Duration, Number of troops in total, Number of troops today.

=== Before 1940 ===
- Schleswig-Holstein, Seven Years' War, 1756-1763, **half the Norwegian army**, 0

=== During World War II ===
This part of the list is very incomplete. See Norway during World War II.

- Atlantic Ocean, Battle of the Atlantic, 1940-1945,?,0
- France, Allied invasion of Normandy, 1944, **1 950**, 0

=== After 1945 ===
- Germany, Allied post-war occupation of Germany, 1947-1953, **ca. 50 000**, 0 (see also: Tysklandsbrigaden)
- Greece, UNSCOB, 1947, 1, 0
- India and Pakistan, UNMOGIP, 1949-1994, 140, 0
- Korea, NORMASH, 1951-1954, 623, 0
- Gaza, UNEF 1, 1956-1957, **10 989**, 0
- Middle East, UNTSO, 1956-today, 617, 13
- Lebanon, UNOGIL, 1958, 54, 0
- Congo, ONUC, 1960-1964, **1 173**, 0
- Yemen, UNYOM, 1963-1964, 7, 0
- Lebanon, UNIFIL, 1978-1999, **34 166**, 0
- Sinai, MFO, 1982-today, 100, 3
- Angola, UNAVEM I, II, III, 1988-1997, 69,0
- Iran and Iraq, UNIIMOG, 1988-1991, 35, 0
- Persian Gulf, Operation Desert Storm, 1991-1992, 350, 0
- Iraq and Kuwait, UNIKOM, 1991-1994, 169, 0
- Somalia, UNOSOM I, II, 1991-1995, 260, 0
- El Salvador, ONUSAL, 1992, 1, 0
- Croatia, UNPROFOR, 1992-1995, **4 401**, 0
- Adriatic Sea, Operation Sharp Guard, 1993-1995, ca. 400, 0
- Bosnia-Herzegovina, IFOR, 1995-1996, **1 777**, 0
- Croatia, UNPF, 1995-1996, 162, 0
- Macedonia, UNPREDEP, 1995-1999, 808, 0
- Croatia, UNTAES, 1996-1998, 16, 0
- Bosnia-Herzegovina, UNMIBH, 1996-?, 4, 0
- Kosovo, KFOR, 1996-2004, **3 650**, 0
- Guatemala, MINUGUA, 1997, 3, 0
- Angola, MONUA, 1997-1999, 24, 0
- Bosnia-Herzegovina, OSCE, 1997-2000, 5, 0
- Croatia/Prevlaka, UNMOP, 1996-1998, 9, 0
- Bosnia-Herzegovina, OSCE, 1997-2000, 5, 0
- Sierra Leone, UNOMSIL, 1998-1999, unknown
- Kosovo, OSCE, 1998-1999, 5, 0
- East-Timor, INTERFET, 1999, 6, 0
- East-Timor, UNTAET, 1999-2002, 18, 0
- Kosovo, UNMIK, 1999-today, 12, 1
- Naples, Allied Force, 1999, 250, 0
- Albania, AFOR, 1999, 10, 0
- Sierra Leone, UNAMSIL, 1999-2000, 7, 0
- Congo, MONUC, 2000-2003, 10, 0
- Ethiopia and Eritrea, UNMEE, 2000-today, 25, 5
- Afghanistan, ISAF Enduring Freedom, 2001-2021, **ca. 2 500**, 0
- Kyrgyzstan, Enduring Freedom, 2002-2003, 210, 0
- Sudan, JMC/VMT, 2002-2005, 6, 0
- Macedonia, Allied Harmony EU, 2003, 5, 0
- Iraq, MNF-I, 2003-2004, 160, 0
- Baltic states, Baltic Air Policing, 2004-2005, 85, 0
- Mediterranean Sea, Operation Active Endeavour, 2004-today, 200, 43
- Bosnia-Herzegovina, EUFOR Operation Althea, 2004-today, 20, 21
- Iraq, NTM-I, 2005, 13, 0
- Sudan, UNMIS, 2005-today, 27, 27
- Norway also assisted in the 2011 military intervention in Libya, in a controversial decision by the governing Labour Party where the Royal Norwegian Air Force dropped 588 bombs on Libyan soil, more than any other country participating in the intervention.

== Sources ==
- Norwegian Defence 2006, ISBN 978-82-7924-058-7
