= Operation Phoutah =

- Part of Laotian Civil War; Vietnam War
Date	15 May – late September 1971
Location	Moung Phalane
Result	Unsuccessful Royalist attempt to capture Muong Phalane

Belligerents
Kingdom of Laos; Supported by United States	North Vietnam; Supported by: Soviet Union; People's Republic of China

Units involved
Groupement Mobile 33; Groupement Mobile 30; Bataillon Guerrier 301; Bataillon Guerrier 302; Bataillon Guerrier 303; Bataillon Guerrier 306; Bataillon Guerrier 314	Group 559

Strength
Battalion and regimental-size	~50,000

Casualties and losses
Heavy	Unknown

Operation Phoutah (15 May – late September 1971) was one of a series of offensive operations aimed at the vital Ho Chi Minh trail complex during the Second Indochina War. Staged by a Central Intelligence Agency-sponsored Royalist Laotian irregular regiment, Operation Phoutah was a defensive strike against an oncoming offensive from the 50,000 North Vietnamese troops safeguarding the major transshipment point centered on Tchepone, Laos. The Royalist objective was the capture and occupation of Moung Phalane, which was needed to continue staging guerrilla raids on the Trail. In this, Operation Phoutah failed.

== Overview ==
The Ho Chi Minh Trail was the key to the Second Indochina War. North Vietnam's People's Army of Vietnam depended on that logistics route to defeat South Vietnam. As a result, during 1969 and 1970, the Central Intelligence Agency (CIA) urged its guerrilla battalions to raid the Trail to disrupt or interdict the supply lines. Eventually, the South Vietnamese launched Operation Lam Son 719 on 8 February 1971 in a failed incursion to cut the Trail. The South Vietnamese failure to sever those lines of communications did not end ground assaults on the Trail.

== Background ==
At the end of January 1971, the People's Army of Vietnam captured the town of Moung Phalane from the CIA-sponsored irregular military battalion, Bataillon Guerrier 303 (BG 303). BG 303 retreated westward toward Dong Hene until ordered to reverse their course. To aid them, the rookie Bataillon Guerrier 314 (BG 314) was ordered to attack northeastward from their base at Kengkok. Both guerrilla battalions went on the offensive on 15 February. BG 314 broke up under enemy fire and was withdrawn. BG 303 managed to attack Moung Phalane, only to be repulsed and pursued back to Dong Hene.

On 16 March 1971, Battalion Guerrier 303 (BG 303) relieved Battalion Guerrier 301 (BG 301) at Dong Hene. Battalion Guerrier 302 (BG 302) arrived on the 20th. On 23 March, the 540 guerrillas moved out at dawn; an assigned RLA contingent disappeared. The guerrillas force-marched into Moung Phalane, which was devoid of communist troops. Moung Phalane then served as a catchment for GM 33 stragglers from Operation Desert Rat. On 3 April, GM 33 left the GM 30 stragglers in garrison at Moung Phalane, moving to Nong Saphong.

To counter this, the PAVN sent portions of six infantry battalions to retake Moung Phalane before the rainy season interfered with communist logistics. To counter this, Savannakhet Unit of the CIA forwarded Bataillon Guerrilla 306 (BG 306) in an eastward truck convoy of reinforcements on 30 April 1971. Ambushed by the communists, BG 306 dispersed under fire. BGs 301 and 302 at Moung Phalane were assaulted by the PAVN for the next three days; the guerrilla battalions suffered heavy losses and withdrew. The oncoming PAVN now threatened the Royalist hold on all Military Region 3. Intelligence evidence received by the CIA said the PAVN objective was the major Royalist airstrip and stronghold at Seno.

== Phase one ==
Operation Phoutah (translation: Grandfather) was thus a defensive operation against an offensive launched by a 50,000 man PAVN Army Corps centered on the Tchepone transshipment point. The counter to this communist attack on Dong Hene was the four battalions of GM 33, BG 313 from GM 30, and a pair each of Royal Lao Army (RLA) M24 Chaffee tanks, M706 Commando armored cars, and 105mm howitzers. There were also infantry detachments scrounged from eight RLA battalions, and a contingent of Commando Raiders. The defense began on 15 May 1971.

The RLA scraps were posted as garrison for Dong Hene itself. Two battalions of GM 33 were posted to push eastwards from Dong Hene; the other two were tasked to thrust east from Kengkok. The probing columns promptly came under communist heavy weapons fire. Platoon-sized raids on Dong Hene also began. On 17 May 1971, the RLA vehicles withdrew westward down Route 9. They ran into a PAVN ambush three kilometers out, which disabled both Chaffee tanks and a truck, stopping the convoy in its tracks. The blocked convoy was overrun two hours later. An attack on GM 33 followed. Its commander called for reinforcements from two RLA paratroop battalions west of Dong Hene. When the sky soldiers did not appear, GM 33 began a fighting retreat. Behind them, the PAVN burned Dong Hene before receding back to Moung Phalane for the rainy season. They blew the highway bridge on Route 9 behind them to hinder pursuit. For the next 13 hours, Groupement Mobile 33 carried their gut-shot colonel and 50 other wounded into safety.

A day later, GM 33 reclaimed the ruins of Dong Hene. They remained there until mid-July.

== Phase two ==
On 14 July 1971, two battalions of GM 33 moved east from Dong Hene along Route 9. The other two moved out southwards toward Nong Boualao, with the aim of picking up the Se Sangsoy River to return northwards toward the enemy. GM 33 was scheduled to meet at Moung Phalane. GM 30 garrisoned Kengkok and Dong Hene; they were slated to occupy Moung Phalane after its capture.

By July's end, GM 33 had been repulsed three times by the PAVN defenses at Moung Phalane and remained stalled outside town. A week into August, GM 33 was relieved by three battalions of GM 30. There was a week's pause before the assault resumed under close air support from AC-130 gunships. With the Royalist battalions at half strength because of casualties, malaria, and desertions, no progress could be made. On 25 September, Bataillon Guerrier 313 (BG 313) arrived to complete GM 30. One last push by the entire GM 30 regiment then failed, and Operation Phoutah ended its defensive offensive.

== Aftermath ==
Military Region 3 became a relatively quiet sector until October 1972.
