= Operation Fast Forward =

Major emergency plan test

Operation Fast Forward is a major test of emergency plans to evacuate large numbers of people from the downtown area of Washington, DC. It is conducted in conjunction with the end of the annual fireworks display on the National Mall on 4 July. A large number of people traditionally leaves the area in the fifteen minutes following the show, and so it was decided to use this annual phenomenon to test the emergency plan.

The plan funnels motorists and pedestrians towards the I-695 Beltway along the designated emergency evacuation routes. Traffic signals are modified so motorists traveling on these evacuation routes receive "green lights" for 240 seconds instead of 90 seconds. The Washington Metropolitan Area Transit Authority runs additional subway cars and buses to aid the movement of people away from the National Mall. The coordinators monitor and gather data on the movement of individuals for future evacuation planning.
