= Operation Pig Bristle =

Royal Australian Air Force transport project

- Objective: Transport of pig bristles urgently needed in Australia from Chongqing to Hong Kong
- Date: May 1946
- Executed by: No. 38 Squadron RAAF
- Outcome: Successful

Operation Pig Bristle was an unusual transport task conducted by the Royal Australian Air Force (RAAF) in May 1946. The operation was ordered by the Australian Government in response to a national shortage of paint brushes, which was hindering housebuilding efforts. No. 38 Squadron of the RAAF was given the task of flying 25 tonnes of pig bristles from Chongqing in China to Hong Kong, from where the bristles were shipped to Australia. The operation took place during the Chinese Civil War, with Chongqing cut off and at risk of capture by Communist forces. The squadron completed this task over a two-week period without loss.

== Background ==
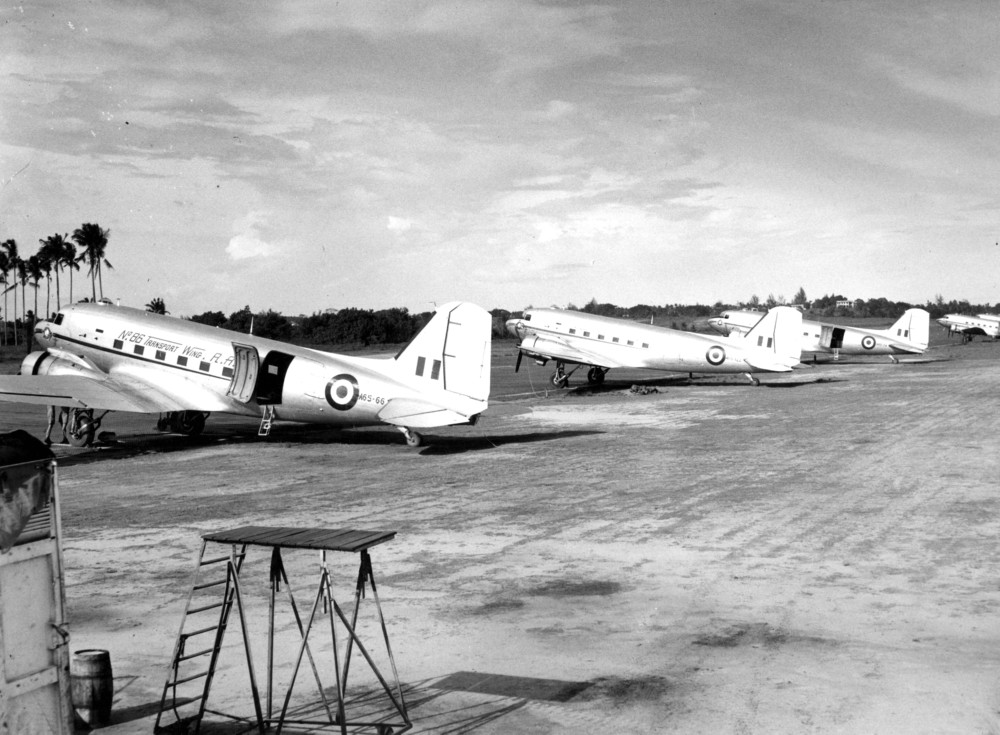
Several No. 38 Squadron Dakotas in 1950

Following World War II, the Australian Commonwealth and state governments launched a joint Commonwealth Housing Scheme to address a national shortage of accommodation. This scheme, and private sector housebuilding activities, was delayed by a shortage of materials, including pig bristles needed to manufacture paint brushes.

At the time, the only available source of pig bristles was China. In 1946, the company Jardine Matheson acquired 100 tonnes (98 long tons; 110 short tons) of bristles for the British government and a further 25 tonnes (25 long tons; 28 short tons) for Australia from remote locations in China near the border with Tibet. These stocks were transported to Chongqing, the capital of the Kuomintang government. Jardine Matheson eventually gained permission to export them to Australia and Britain. These bristles were sufficient to meet Australia's needs for several months.

As the Chinese Civil War was raging at the time and Communist forces were attacking river boats travelling from Chongqing, it was judged necessary to transport the pig bristles from the city by air. The Kuomintang government agreed to allow RAAF and Royal Air Force aircraft to fly return flights between Hong Kong and Chongqing between 1 and 14 May only. After arriving in Hong Kong, the bristles would be shipped to Australia by sea. Both the Kuomintang government and the Communist forces were concerned about the presence of foreigners in China, and the Australian aircrew were warned that they would be imprisoned if they landed anywhere other than Chongqing or an emergency airstrip at Canton.

== Operation ==
The RAAF's No. 38 Squadron was selected to transport Australia's share of the bristles. This squadron was equipped with Douglas Dakota aircraft, and was responsible at the time for conducting regular flights from Australia to Japan carrying personnel and supplies for the Australian element of the British Commonwealth Occupation Force. A detachment of three Dakotas led by No. 38 Squadron's commanding officer, Squadron Leader John Balfe, was sent from Australia to Hong Kong in preparation for the task. As flying conditions were expected to be difficult, each of these aircraft was manned by two highly experienced pilots as well as another airman who performed the duties of navigator, radio operator and flight engineer.

The flights from Hong Kong to Chongqing began in early May 1946. At this time Chongqing had been isolated by Communist forces, and foreign embassies were being evacuated from the city ahead of its expected occupation by the Communists. No navigation aids were available to guide the Australian aircraft, and their crews had to use inaccurate road maps for navigation during the 1,100-kilometre (680 mi) trips between Chongqing and Hong Kong. The RAAF aircrew found the flights between Hong Kong and Chongqing to be challenging as a result of mountains around the Chinese city, as well as the expected lack of accurate weather forecasts and navigation aids. As the Australian legation was evacuated from Chongqing in early May, the RAAF aircrew slept at the British embassy when they needed to overnight in the city. The detachment was successful in flying out the pig bristles within the two weeks available, with eight return flights being made to Chongqing. In his memoirs Balfe attributed this success to "reasonable weather and everyone's enthusiasm". After completing their task, the three Dakotas left Hong Kong bound for Australia on 14 May.

== Delivery ==
Some of the pig bristles were rushed to Australia on board No. 38 Squadron aircraft, and the remainder were transported from Hong Kong by sea. On 29 May it was reported that the shortage of pig bristles had been overcome. One of the pilots involved in Operation Pig Bristle received the Air Force Cross in the 1948 New Years Honours in recognition of his role in the operation. RAAF official historian Alan Stephens wrote in 1995 that "John Balfe's brief but thrilling account of his team's exotic adventure should be mandatory reading in every RAAF air transport crew room".
