= Operation Century =

1995 British police sting operation

Operation Century was the code name for a sting operation by Essex Police for investigating the Rettendon murders of three violent drug dealers that happened at Rettendon, Essex, England, in December 1995. It was assisted by RUC Special Branch officers. The purpose of the operation was to pressure people whom the police suspected of having knowledge about the triple murder, in order to incriminate the suspects in question and/or others.

== Overview ==
The operation produced no arrests or evidence leading to a criminal prosecution. A prosecution that was eventually brought in connection with the Rettendon murders, was wholly based on police operations subsequent to the abandonment and closure of Operation Century. The tactics deployed by Essex and Royal Ulster Constabulary Special Branch while Operation Century was under way, increasingly led to police voicing serious threats against the suspects in question. The operation was carefully timed to coincide with the 1996 Docklands bombing of Canary Wharf on the evening of 9 February, which marked the ending of the previous mainland Republican bombing campaign ceasefire. Any persons involved as witnesses during the triple killings, entered into a relocation and witness protection programme. One of the Essex suspects received a call from Belfast within minutes of the Canary Wharf explosion. The Rettendon Triple Murders had no Irish connection in themselves or with the bombing. Irish affairs were introduced solely by police as part of the underlying leverage for their undercover operation.

Transcripts of these phone calls became available (see later and "sources" footnote) and police eventually had to acknowledge that they were made by Belfast-based Special Branch officers. These calls were repeatedly made to the Essex suspects from Ireland, by RUC Special Branch posing as Republican drug runners (Irish Billy and Irish John), making it clear that they could rely upon organisational back up and additionally claiming that they had funded the criminal activities of one of the Rettendon murder victims, who they were still demanding repayment from. This ruse failed to manipulate the suspects into agreeing to meet.

There was a problem in trying to accurately portray what levels of threat and abuse Essex Police/Special Branch descended to during the course of this operation – the language was extremely foul-mouthed and threatening (and could have been taken by the suspects as amounting to death threats – see "documents" sources link below). It is clear from the Sun newspaper and (Essex Basildon Echo) reports referred to below, that grave exception was taken to this aspect of the police operation.

In a call on 26 February 1996, undercover Special Branch threatened: "I've got (expletive deleted) A levels ... A levels in (expletive deleted) whacking (expletive deleted) people ... "it's time you did (expletive deleted) take these calls seriously ... as far as you're concerned you're (expletive deleted) cease fire's going ... I'll be in touch with you very (expletive deleted) soon ..... I've got a way, see what I (expletive deleted) do ... you watch your (expletive deleted) car".

One of the suspects victimised in this manner was the live-in partner of one of the murdered men by whom she had a young child. She claims to have had no knowledge at the time that these threatening tactics were not being deployed by Belfast-based Republicans and so she sought the assistance of Essex Police who, after appearing to have investigated the matter, informed her that the calls were made from Belfast, there were Republican connections and that the latter had now crossed to mainland Great Britain where they had had since been lost track of by police. The effect of these torture tactics upon an already distraught and grieving mother has been deplored.

Details concerning this undercover police operation came to light, when persons were brought to trial towards the end of 1997 in connection with the Rettendon killings. Dated–timed tape recordings of the threatening police phone calls, recorded by one of the Operation Century "suspects" were produced in evidence by defence counsel and were played in court. They showed that the undercover police calls were increasingly threatening as Operation Century unravelled, because the suspects did not believe that Belfast Republicans had ever funded Essex criminal enterprises and so did not conform as the undercover officers had hoped.

The highly controversial nature of the operation occasioned journalists to take matters up with the senior officer (Detective Superintendent Ivan Dibley) who masterminded it. It came to light that it had been considered an appropriate tactic by Dibley because a recent earlier (Metropolitan Police) undercover honey trap sting operation ("Operation Edzell", 1993–1994) against Colin Stagg in the Rachel Nickell murder case had not actually been described as illegal by the Stagg trial judge, Mr Justice Ognall, although he had scathingly dismissed the prosecution, because police had used disgraceful tactics of the grossest kind.

== Service delivery standards ==
Essex Police prided itself in having developed well publicised Service Delivery Standards (SDS). SDS 1.4 set out how Essex Police would treat those whom they had reason to investigate in connection with criminal offences "according to the principles of the Universal Declaration of Human Rights ... based on the dignity and worth of the individual". However, for this undercover police operation those Service Delivery Standards were abandoned – see documents link in sources below.

== Essex Chief Constable letter ==
The then Chief Constable of Essex, John H Burrow. CBE. in correspondence wrote:

Essex Police is, and will remain, committed to ensuring the highest principles in dealing with persons suspected of committing crimes..." (14 May 1998), "The approved plan of action quite specifically sought to create a realistic scenario without direct threats being made against any individual" (29 May 1998), "I am not prepared to engage in retrospective or hypothetical analysis of issues emanating from Operation Century and can assist no further.(11 June 1998)

A senior Essex officer (Detective Superintendent Ivan Dibley) subsequently boasted in a media interview that he had had no intention of approaching certain Century suspects in the normal way and claimed that those Century suspects had been Rettendon murder suspects from the start of their Rettendon investigations. It was similarly stated to journalists by Det. Supt. Dibley that in deploying Century tactics he was "breaking new ground" and hoping that they'd get away with it at court if evidence had been obtained. Another highly dubious and judicially censored undercover police operation (Operation Edzell – deployed by the Metropolitan Police Service in the then relatively current Rachel Nickell murder case) was also cited to journalists by Supt. Dibley as the backdrop against which Century had been adjudged by police as being fit to deploy.

== Essex Police Authority ==
After the Rettendon Triple Murder Trial had concluded (January 1998) representations were made (14 February 1998) to both the Chair and every member of Essex Police Authority. The representations were made in the light of Essex Police agreement to adhere to "Service Delivery Standards". The (then) EPA Chair (Anthony Peel – 20 February 1998) replied with thanks for “a thought provoking letter”. He stressed that if Operation Century tactics had produced any confessional evidence “they most certainly would not (have) been admissible in evidence at any (criminal) trial”. He sought to lessen the gravity with which Essex Police Authority viewed Operation Century tactics by averring that “no part of the national media had reported Operation Century” except one national media outlet and that he did not know “the source of the information” provided to that particular newspaper. He stressed that Police Authorities could not become embroiled in “operational matters”, stressed that there is an established police complaints procedure and that no complaints so far as he knew had been made. “In this particular case the Police Authority are satisfied that the Essex Police have detected a particularly nasty violent crime and that this is entirely in accordance with the Local Policing Plan objectives furthering the effective policing of the area”.

A year later in a subsequent letter (2 March 1999) Peel confirmed his view that Operation Century was a "matter of operational policing ... basically not a matter for the Authority ... I have satisfied myself that the investigative matters had been properly authorised ... and therefore did not need to be brought to the attention of the Authority".

== Home Office response letter ==
Representations were made to the (then) Home Office Ministers Kate Hoey and Paul Boateng. On 19 May 1999, Hoey enclosed a letter from Mr Boateng (its date had been blacked out) who wrote that Century had been deployed because "all conventional methods had been exhausted and a covert operation was the last option to infiltrate the criminal network. All issues and decisions were considered at the highest level before being actioned ... Since the actions and decisions taken by police officers ... are operational matters they are the responsibility of the chief officer of police ... there is no authority for Ministers to intervene in police commanders' operational responsibility. I suggest that the matter should be taken up directly with the Chief Officer if there are specific concerns about their work". Kate Hoey expressed an "appreciation that this was not a response that one would have hoped for".

== Sources ==
For various relevant documents see

- Cameron, Ian (September 1999). "We're Breaking New Ground: Operation Century". – The above link now provides this complete original OPERATION CENTURY report text/documents.
