= Canadian response to Hurricane Katrina =

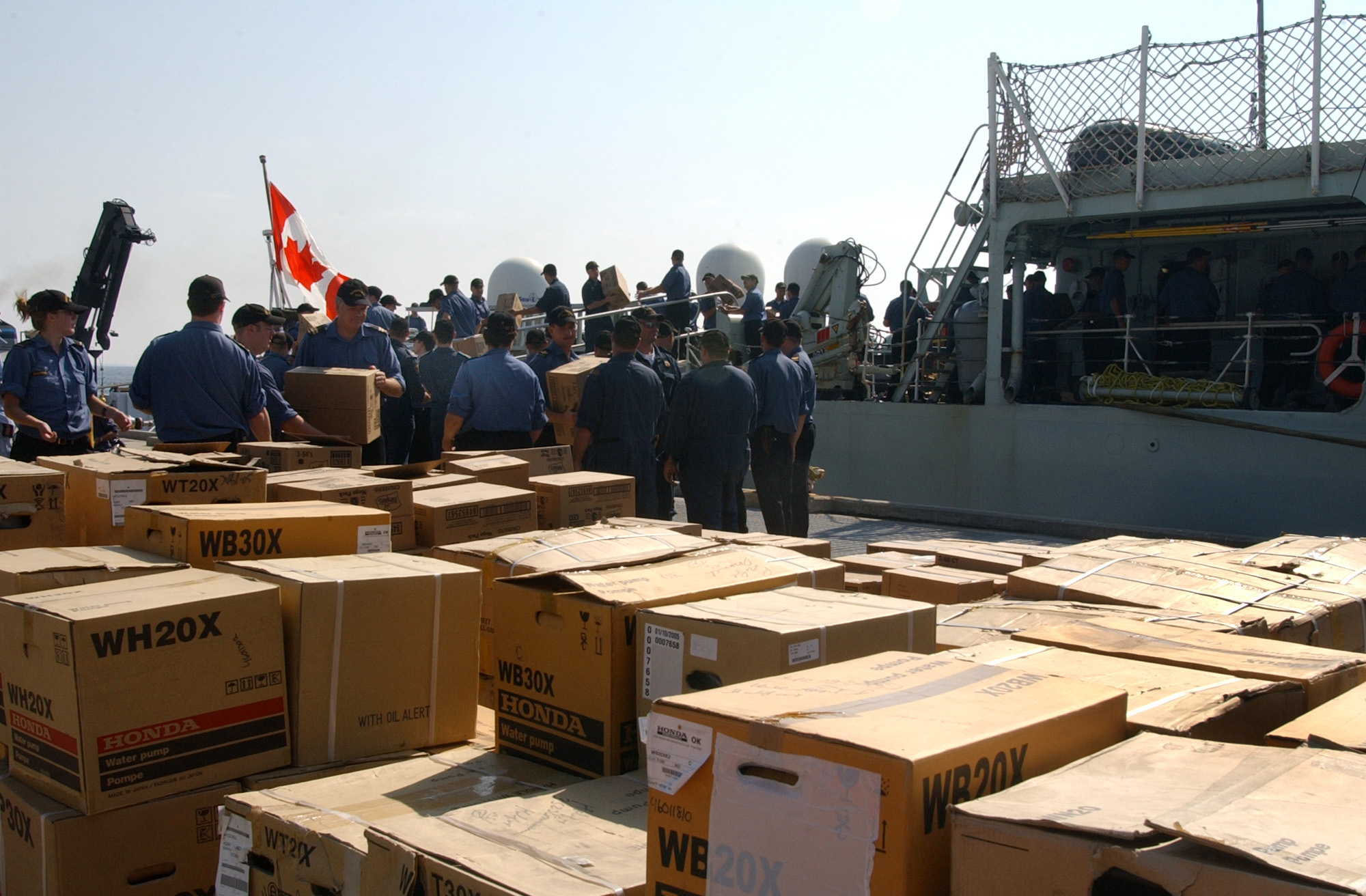
Canadian Sailors from HMCS Athabaskan unload supplies on a pier at the Naval Air Station Pensacola, Florida as part of Hurricane Katrina disaster relief efforts

Canada was one of the countries to provide the most aid and relief for Hurricane Katrina. They provided ships, supplies, volunteers, search-and-rescue teams, and more. It also accepted some evacuees to stay in Canada.

== Official Canadian government response ==
The official response by the Government of Canada to the Gulf coast disaster came on September 2, following discussions between Public Safety and Emergency Preparedness Canada and the U.S. Federal Emergency Management Agency. The federal government announced it was deploying a task force composed of three warships—HMCS Athabaskan, HMCS Toronto and HMCS Ville de Québec—along with the Coast Guard vessel CCGS Sir William Alexander. Three Sea King helicopters and one BO-105 helicopter were also deployed to the area.

The Canadian Forces provided several Griffon helicopters and crews to the New England States at the request of the United States Coast Guard whose search and rescue helicopters from that area had been assigned to Gulf Coast SAR operations. Canadian aircraft were deployed as part of a North American Free Trade Agreement (NAFTA) military assistance pact.

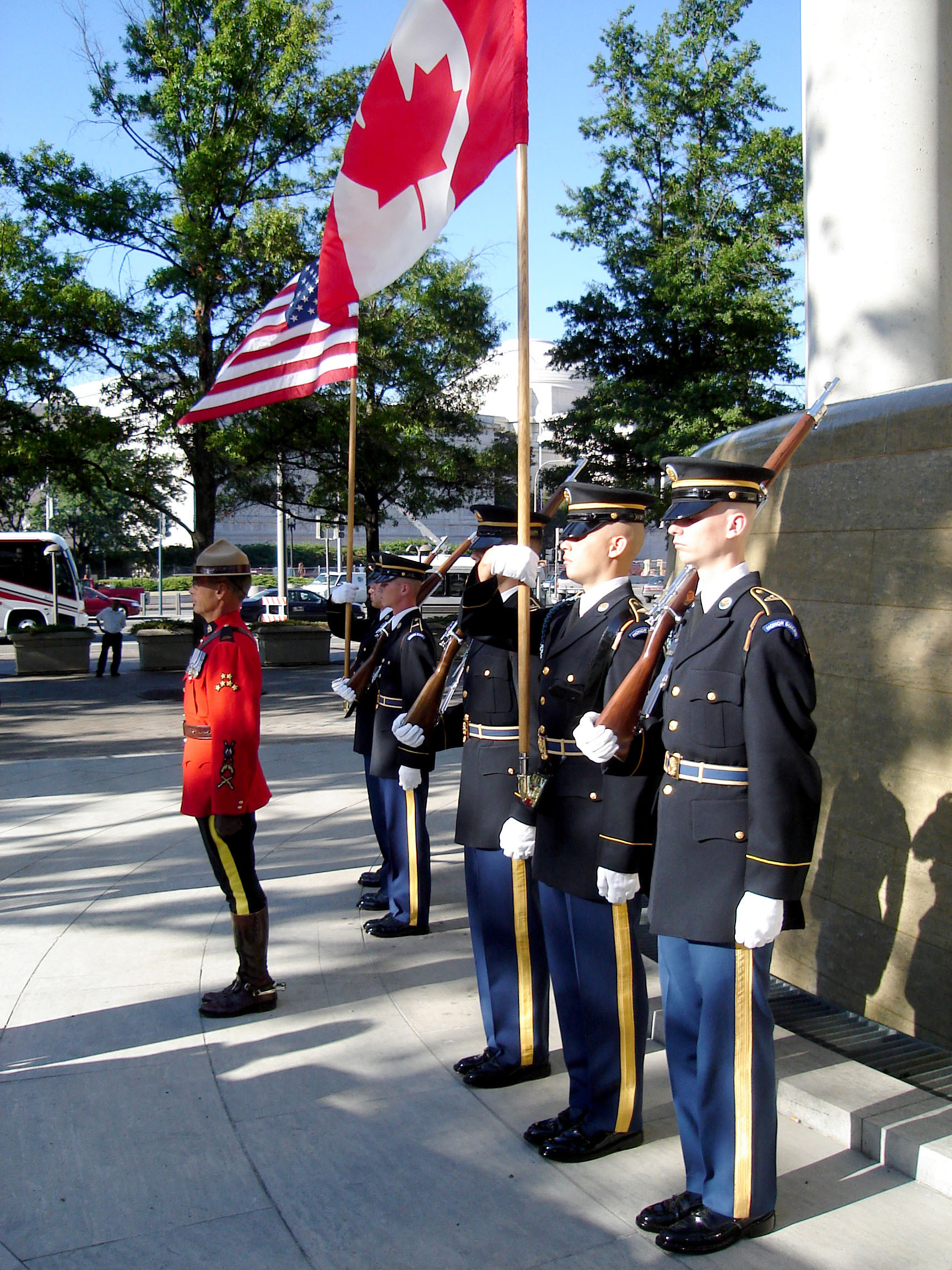
U.S. infantry led by the RCMP outside the Canadian Embassy on September 7 to raise funds for Katrina victims.

The task force was organized under the name "Operation UNISON" and involved over 1,000 personnel from the Canadian Forces and Canadian Coast Guard who were placed under the operational command of their American counterparts who were coordinating relief operations. A precedent was established with a similar humanitarian aid response by the Government of Canada following Hurricane Andrew when the Auxiliary Oil Replenishment (AOR) ship HMCS Protecteur participated in "Operation TEMPEST", providing relief supplies and personnel in southern Florida and the Bahamas.

The ships and aircraft had the capacity to relocate people and deliver a broad range of supplies, including tents, cots, water containers and items such as men's and women's toiletries, sun screen and insect repellent. At the same time, the Public Health Agency of Canada was in contact with the U.S. Department of Health and Human Services and offered whatever support was required. "We are really prepared to operate on all fronts as requested and as co-ordinated by the United States," said Prime Minister Paul Martin.

In an interview on National Public Radio, Canada's Ambassador to the United States said that in addition to the basic desire to help a neighbour in need, many Canadians also remember the ancestors of Louisiana's Cajuns were expelled from what would become Canada by the British in the 18th century, which he felt gave an extra historical dimension to Canadians' desire to help the people of Louisiana during the recovery operation.

On September 4, following a request from U.S. Department of Health and Human Services, the Government of Canada announced it was prepared to send thousands of beds, blankets, surgical gloves and dressings and other medical supplies. The Government of Canada announced it would also send 35 divers to help with the rescue effort. One of the divers' tasks would be to inspect levees.

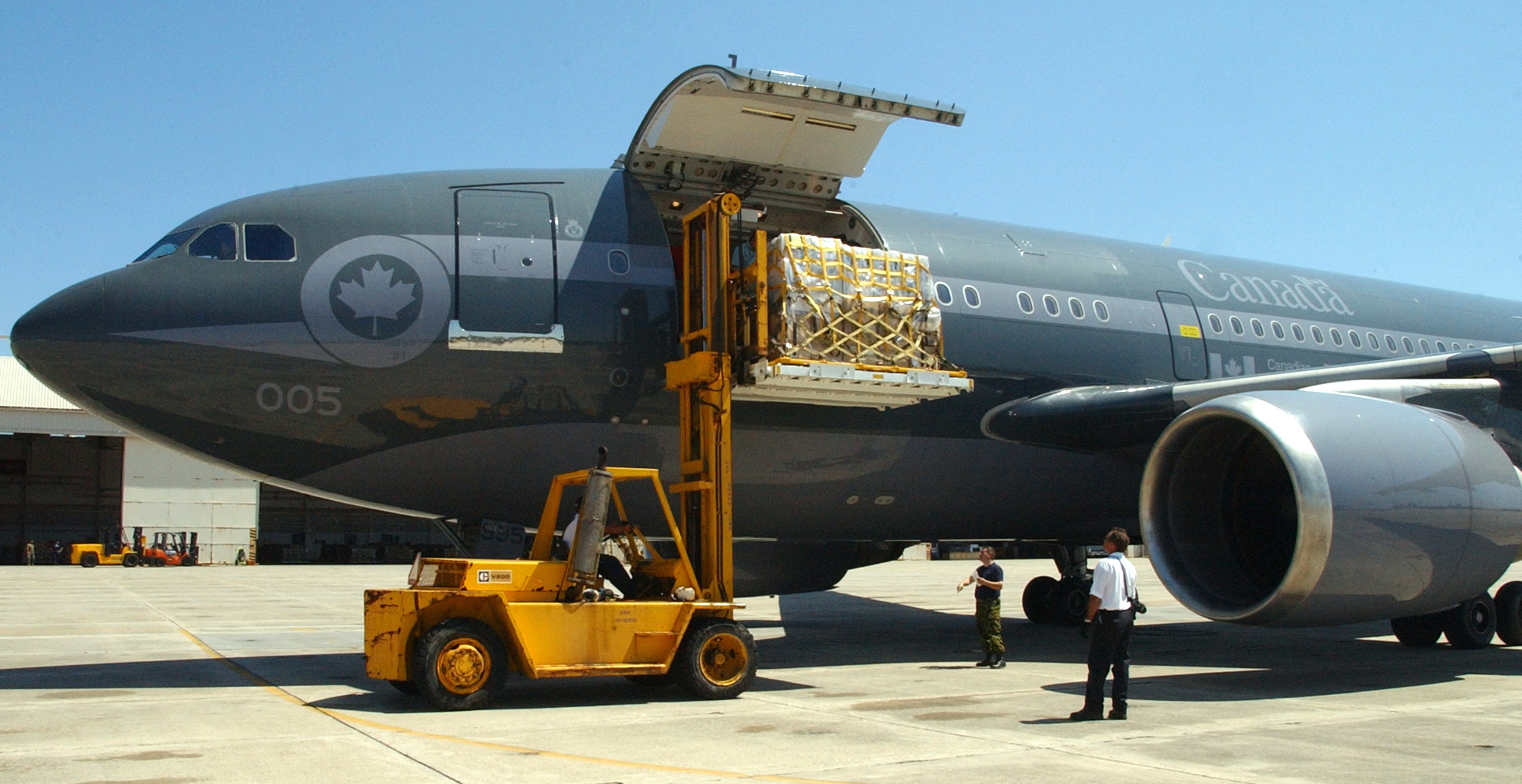
United States Navy personnel unload Canadian relief supplies from a Royal Canadian Air Force transport aircraft in Pensacola, Florida.

On September 5, a team of 35 military divers was deployed from CFB Halifax and CFB Esquimalt to Pensacola, Florida. They were tasked with assisting their U.S. Navy counterparts to clear navigational hazards, including unsecured and sunken vessels and debris, and to inspect flood-damaged levees.

On September 6 the Operation UNISON task force of navy and coast guard ships departed Halifax Harbour for the U.S. Gulf Coast. The naval ships arrived at Pensacola, Florida several days later, having been delayed by further tropical storm activity off the east coast of Florida. The coast guard ship arrived several days later, due to its slower cruising speed. The Operation UNISON task force unloaded relief supplies at Pensacola and was deployed to assist along the Mississippi coast.

On September 19 it was announced that the three warships from the Operation UNISON task force would be returning to Halifax, leaving CCGS Sir William Alexander to continue its mission of clearing navigation hazards and repairing buoys. On September 28, the coast guard vessel was retasked to assist the National Oceanic and Atmospheric Administration in repairing the network of weather buoys along the Gulf of Mexico and Atlantic coasts of the United States, which had been severely damaged by the 2005 Atlantic hurricane season; these buoys are one of the most important tools for forecasting and gathering data from oceanic storms. CCGS Sir William Alexander returned to Canada on October 24.

== Vancouver Urban Search and Rescue ==
One of the first things Canada did was to deploy Vancouver Urban Search and Rescue to Louisiana. They arrived on a WestJet aircraft in Lafayette, Louisiana on the evening of August 31, 2005. Due to security and logistics issues in the disaster area surrounding New Orleans, the team started operations on September 3; they saved 30 people that day. They were the first outside responders to arrive in St. Bernard Parish, beating American response teams. By the time they returned to Vancouver on September 6, they had reportedly saved over 110 people.

== Other help ==
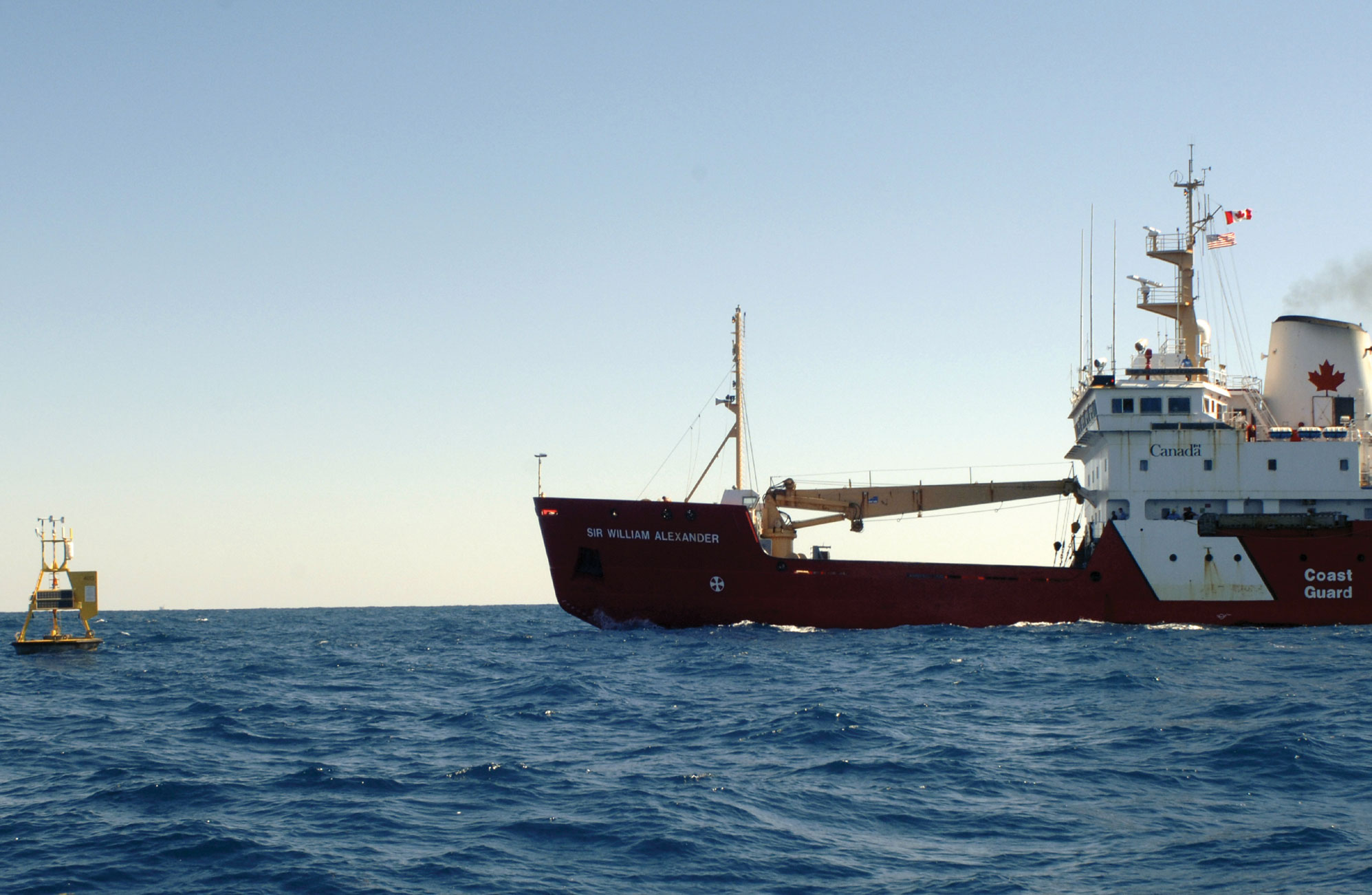
CCGS Sir William Alexander assisting in New Orleans, following Hurricane Katrina.

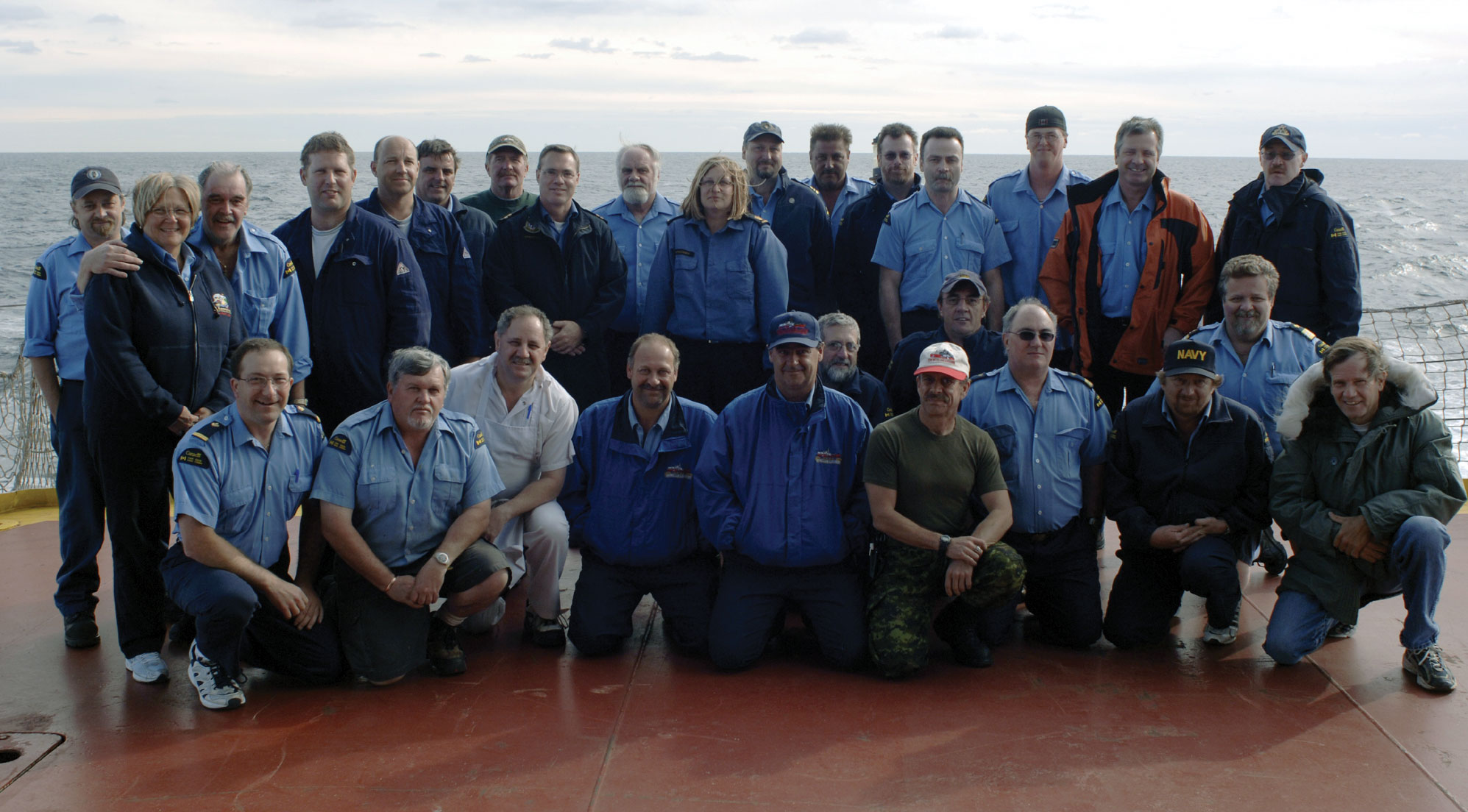
The crew of CCGS Sir William Alexander pose for a picture shortly before arriving home after assisting in New Orleans, following Hurricane Katrina.

- The Canadian Red Cross launched an immediate nationwide appeal for donations to enable the organization to provide aid to its American counterpart. 37 Canadian Red Cross personnel were transported by Canadian military aircraft to assist with efforts in Houston, Texas; they were followed by dozens of other Red Cross personnel once the situation assessment was completed. The American Red Cross asked Canadian Red Cross chapters in Quebec for cots for refugees staying at U.S. evacuation centres and other services were requested from chapters in Ontario.
- The Government of Nova Scotia donated $100,000 towards the Red Cross effort. This was followed on September 8 when the Government of Alberta announced that it was donating $5 million to the Hurricane Katrina fund administered by former presidents Bush and Clinton. The cheque was personally given by Premier Ralph Klein to former president Clinton during a visit to Alberta in October.
- Other provinces expressed interest in providing temporary housing to those left homeless. Some residents of Nova Scotia, New Brunswick and Prince Edward Island offered shelter to the homeless survivors of hurricane Katrina. Anne McLellan, the Minister of Public Safety and Emergency Preparedness, announced that her department was discussing with the U.S. National Security Advisor the possibility of Canadians billeting American storm evacuees. Big cities like Calgary, Ottawa, Vancouver, Toronto, and Montreal accepted 1,200 evacuees in all .
- Universities across Canada offered to take in university students from New Orleans whose studies have been interrupted. Some institutions went so far as to offer full tuition scholarships and free room and board.
- Ontario Hydro, Hydro-Québec, and Manitoba Hydro, along with other electrical utilities, sent repair crews to assist in restoring electrical power service.
- Canada increased oil exports as requested by the IEA to help stabilize the world market in the wake of the crisis and its impact on North American oil production and refining capacity.
- On September 2, Air Canada participated along with U.S. member airlines of the Air Transport Association, in a voluntary airline industry initiative to support rescue and relief operations. Air Canada was the first foreign carrier to land in New Orleans delivering water and supplies and lifting victims to safety.
- On September 7, the Canadian Embassy started a Hurricane Katrina fund to support victims in the Gulf region. Frank McKenna, Canadian ambassador to the United States, told Americans "you are our friends and together we are family – you do not suffer alone."

== See also ==
- Canadaville, Louisiana
- Hurricane Katrina
- Hurricane Katrina disaster relief
- Canada's response to the December 2004 Indian Ocean earthquake and tsunami
- Canada's response to Hurricane Katrina
- Canada's response to the May 2008 Sichuan earthquake
- Canada's response to the January 2010 Haiti earthquake
- Canada's response to the March 2011 Japan earthquake and tsunami
- Canada's response to Typhoon Haiyan
- Canada's response to the April and May 2015 Nepal earthquake
