= Operation FALCON =

Lengthy dragnets operation

Operation FALCON (Federal and Local Cops Organized Nationally) is the name of several week-long dragnets organized by the United States Marshals Service. FALCON I occurred between April 4 and 10, 2005 (also Crime Victims' Rights Week), FALCON II during the week of April 17–23, 2006, and FALCON III from October 22–28, 2006.

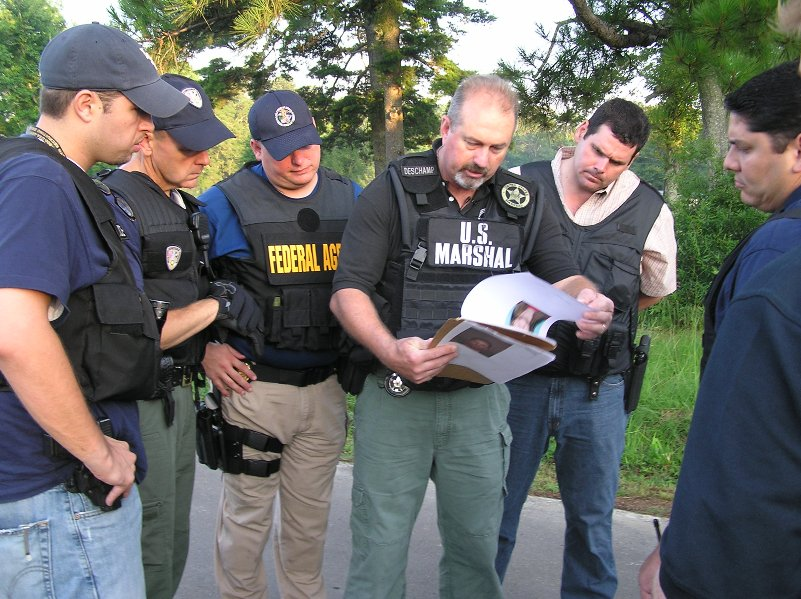
Marshals are briefed for Operation FALCON III in 2008.

During FALCON I, a total of 10,340 federal fugitives were arrested in all 50 U.S. states, as well as Puerto Rico and Guam, by 3,000 to 10,000 law enforcement officers from such agencies as the ATF, the FBI, the Secret Service, and the United States Department of Housing and Urban Development.

FALCON netted the largest number of arrests ever recorded during a single operation. This included the arrests of 162 accused or convicted of murder, 638 wanted for armed robbery, 553 wanted for rape or sexual assault, 154 gang members, and 106 unregistered sex offenders. The largest category of arrests (4,291) was for narcotics violations. Other large classes of wanted fugitives arrested included 1818 burglary suspects and 1727 assault suspects. In addition to the arrests, 243 weapons, 30 kg of cocaine, 19 kg of heroin, 204 kg of marijuana and $373,000 in cash were seized by Operation FALCON teams.

Although the Marshals Service coordinated the sweep, most of the manpower for the arrests came from local law enforcement: 206 state law enforcement agencies, 302 county sheriffs' departments, and 366 city police departments were involved, as well as 25 federal agencies and all 83 districts of the U.S. Marshals Service, which allocated about $900,000 to the operation.
