= Operation Eager Glacier =

1987–88 US intelligence operation in the Iran–Iraq War

Operation Eager Glacier was a secret U.S. effort to spy on Iran with aircraft in 1987 and 1988. The information gathered became part of an intelligence exchange between U.S. military intelligence services and Iraq during the Iran–Iraq War.

Eager Glacier took place at the same time as other U.S. military operations in the Persian Gulf, including Operation Earnest Will, the naval escort of Kuwaiti-owned tankers; Operation Prime Chance, the secret attempt to prevent Iranian forces from attacking Gulf shipping; and Operation Praying Mantis, the retaliation for the mining of the U.S. guided-missile frigate USS Samuel B. Roberts.

== Aftermath ==
Years after, on 22 July 1992, former chairman of the Joint Chiefs of Staff Admiral William J. Crowe testified to the House Armed Services Committee regarding charges that the Pentagon had concealed evidence about the 1988 downing of an Iranian airliner by the U.S. Navy cruiser USS Vincennes. As Crowe denied the coverup charges, he spoke briefly about Eager Glacier and other efforts to provide U.S. intelligence to Iraq. Crowe said that Pentagon officials had briefed "the pertinent congressional committees" about Eager Glacier on October 5, 6, and 13 October 1987. He also said, "Incidentally, in my judgment, these exchanges were not especially profitable."

== Works ==
The book No Higher Honor mentions how intelligence between pilots nearly cost them their lives, and "For those who had somehow failed to get the picture," it's what signaled the end of the operation.
