= Operation Albatros =

Narcotics operation by Turkey off Libya's coast

Operation Albatros was a major narcotics operation carried out by the Turkish Coast Guard in coordination with the Turkish Navy in international waters off the coast of Libya against a Bolivian flagged ship lasting from 3 January to 7 January 2016. The operation lead to the arrest of all ten Syrian crew members and the seizure of over 13.6 tons of marijuana in powdered form. The operation was the first such in international waters in over 22 years since the Lucky-S incident and Kısmetim-1 incident. The initial raid was carried out on 6 January by Turkish coast guard special operations teams from boat and helicopter and lasted another day whilst a complete search of the ship upon arrest of the crew was being conducted. According to the ministry, the Turkish Security Directorate's anti-narcotics unit received information on the Bolivian-flagged ship and contacted the Turkish Coast Guard. The Turkish Coast Guard determined the location of the ship on Jan. 3 and began pursuit with an aircraft and a ship. The operation was authorized by Turkey's Foreign Ministry in cooperation with the Bolivian government and in line with UN treaties on drugs trafficking. According to the Turkish Coast Guard most of the illicit drugs were heading to Europe for distribution and the ship was heading from the Syrian port city of Tartus to Tobruk, Libya.
