= UNAVEM =

United Nations Angola Verification Mission (UNAVEM) was the name of three UN peacekeeping missions in Angola between 1988 and 1997.

- UNAVEM I
- UNAVEM II
- UNAVEM III
