= Operation Roll-Up =

Operation Roll-Up was an effort by the United States Army to reclaim, refurbish, and redeploy equipment from World War II into the Korean War.

== Background and Initial Plans ==
After World War II, significant budget cuts and rapid demobilization had impaired the Army's ability to store and maintain equipment. While machine guns and towed artillery were available in quantity, self-propelled equipment, new tanks, and antiaircraft artillery was generally unavailable and in poor condition. General MacArthur also complained to military leadership about lack of personnel and general support of his Far East Command (FEC) in the late 1940s, with severe manpower shortages compromising his ability to defend Korea (which was not considered to be of strategic importance to the United States).

The plan to recover equipment scattered throughout the Pacific region after World War II was initially proposed soon after the war ended, and even by 1947 nearly a million tons of materiel had been surplussed and sold to the Philippines alone. In 1949, 200,000 tons of ordnance was shipped to Japan for refurbishment. However, though Operation Roll-Up was originally expected to be complete by June 30, 1950, the lack of support and labor prevented full execution of the Operation's goals on schedule. While 90 percent of armament and 75 percent of automotive equipment available to the FEC was derived from the first stages of Operation Roll-Up, effective readiness of materiel in the Far East Command was limited to 60-day stocks at depot levels and an additional 30 days in station stocks. These were average levels (some equipment was barely to be found at all) and one estimate put the "unserviceable" levels of these 60 day stocks at around 80 percent. For some types of equipment, only about one quarter of the advertised number of units were actually able to operate. Less than a tenth of the recoilless rifles assigned to the Eighth Army were functional.

== Expedited Action ==
Within two weeks of the start of the Korean War, it became apparent to the Army that the 8th Division would have to be generally committed to fighting over the summer, and additional reinforcements were requested from Washington. To support the Army's buildup and the losses encountered early in the fighting, the process of recovering WWII equipment was expedited, with much of the labor provided by Japanese seamen operating American-flagged ships.

Much of the rehabilitation was performed in Japan, with initial preparation in the combat area itself supported by Korean locals in addition to US personnel. Vehicles were deconstructed, cleaned with chemicals or rebuilt to be made functional, tested to ensure functionality (including test drives through an obstacle course), and shipped to the front lines as quickly as possible. For example, 52 hours after Marines were ambushed in Chosin, a complete set of equipment required to rearm the unit was shipped to the front lines. Ultimately, 45 percent of the tanks, 82 percent of armored cars, and 75 percent of the artillery used in the conflict were recovered equipment left behind after the end of Pacific operations in WWII.

The reclamation process extended beyond vehicles. The first three months of fighting saw 100,000 tons of munitions expended, all of it surplus from WWII and recovered during Operation Roll-Up. Additionally, 89,000 M1 rifles were refurbished and committed to battle within the first four months of fighting. Sixty-four percent of precision instruments such as surveying equipment was reclaimed, and ultimately 80 percent of infantry weaponry (including bazookas and mortars) were recovered from WWII stocks.

== Results ==
The massive influx of equipment allowed the initial losses to be overcome more rapidly than shipping stored equipment (however well maintained) could be accomplished from depots on the American mainland. Perhaps more importantly, the facilities and infrastructure required to perform the refurbishment contributed to rebuilding Japan's industrial base.

In addition to providing material support to the fighting on the front, the operation was advertised as a cost-saving measure, with many of the per-unit costs being reduced by 50 to 95 percent over new unit fabrication. The Army claimed hundreds of thousands of dollars of savings in reclaiming rubber tires alone. As a whole, this and other cost saving measures were advertised as $8 billion.
