= 1970 in the Vietnam War =

← 1969 1971 →
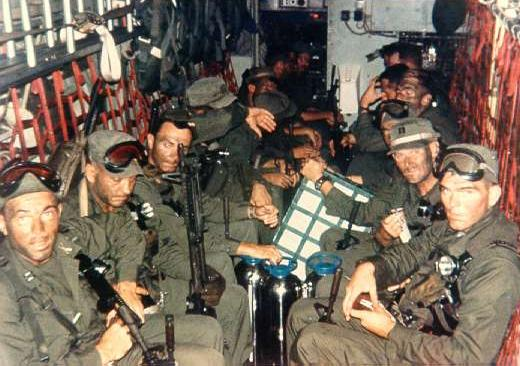
- Blueboy assault group aboard Banana HH-3E at the start of Operation Ivory Coast
Location	Vietnam

Belligerents
Anti-Communist forces: South Vietnam; United States; South Korea; Australia; Philippines; New Zealand (Cambodia) Khmer Republic; Thailand; Kingdom of Laos	Communist forces: North Vietnam (Provisional Revolutionary Government of the Republic of South Vietnam) Viet Cong (Cambodia) Khmer Rouge (Laos) Pathet Lao; People's Republic of China; Soviet Union

Strength
South Vietnam: 968,000; United States: 335,790; South Korea: 48,540; Thailand: 11,570; Australia: 6,800; Philippines: 70 New Zealand: 440	

Casualties and losses
US: 6,173 killed South Vietnam: 23,346 killed	Unknown

The United States continued its unilateral withdrawal of forces from South Vietnam notwithstanding the lack of progress at the Paris Peace Talks. The removal of Prince Norodom Sihanouk from power in Cambodia in March and his replacement by General Lon Nol, began the Cambodian Civil War. South Vietnamese and U.S. forces entered Cambodia in late April to attack People's Army of Vietnam (PAVN) and Vietcong (VC) bases and supply lines there which had long been used to support the insurgency in South Vietnam. The expansion of the war revitalized the antiwar movement in the U.S. and led to the Kent State shootings and Jackson State killings in May. While U.S. ground forces withdrew from Cambodia at the end of June and legislation was passed to prevent their reintroduction, the South Vietnamese conducted operations in Cambodia for the rest of the year and the U.S. provided air support and military aid to the Cambodian government. Despite this support the Cambodians lost control of vast areas of the country to the PAVN. Within South Vietnam the second half of the year saw a reduction in large U.S. operations with the focus shifting to pacification and population security and supporting Vietnamization. The PAVN/VC generally reverted to sapper attacks and attacks by fire but they fought hard to defend their base areas and infiltration routes.

== January ==
2-3 January

People's Army of Vietnam (PAVN) forces attacked a U.S. 23rd Infantry Division night defensive position near Đức Phổ Base Camp. In the four hour battle 29 PAVN and seven U.S. soldiers were killed.

6 January

Under the cover of monsoon rains the Vietcong (VC) 409th Battalion attacked the 1st Battalion, 7th Marines at Firebase Ross with mortars and sappers penetrating the wire. The attack was repulsed by 04:00 with 13 Marines and 38 VC killed.

8 January

President of South Vietnam Nguyễn Văn Thiệu announced that it would be impossible for U.S. forces to fully withdraw from South Vietnam by the end of 1970 and called for increased aid and training and phased U.S. withdrawal over several years.

16 January

The VC attacked a refugee camp on the Batangan Peninsula killing 16 civilians and wounding 21.

18 January

VC bombs exploded at the Thủ Đức Military Academy killing 18 people and wounding 33.

18-24 January

The first Tour de Vietnam cycle race in 14 years began, following a 500 miles (800 km) course from Nha Trang to Long Xuyên. The race was to demonstrate the extent of government control over the countryside, however the competitors were escorted by armored vehicles and helicopter gunships.

19 January to 22 July

The 1st Brigade, 5th Infantry Division launched Operation Green River in Quảng Trị Province. The operation results in 106 PAVN soldiers killed and 37 U.S. killed.

21 January

A PAVN/VC artillery attack on Bien Hoa Air Base damaged a C–123, a C–7 and a UH–1.

A box of 81 mm mortar ammunition exploded at Firebase Nancy, 20 miles (32 km) north-northeast of Xuân Lộc, killed 13 soldiers of the U.S. 4th Battalion, 12th Infantry Regiment.

22 January

A PAVN/VC attack on a Republic of Vietnam Marine Division (VNMC) base in the Mekong Delta results in 72 PAVN/VC and 15 VNMC killed.

28 January

United States Air Force (USAF) jets attacked an SA-2 missile site near the Mụ Giạ Pass after it fired on a U.S. reconnaissance jet. One USAF F-105G Wild Weasel was shot down during the raid. Jolly Green 71 an HH-53B combat search and rescue helicopter was shot down by a missile fired from a Mig-21 piloted by Vu Ngoc Dinh of the Vietnam People's Air Force 921st Fighter Regiment as it attempted to rescue the aircrew. The 6-man crew were all killed.

A Gallup poll showed that 65% of Americans approved of President Richard Nixon's handling of the war.

30 January

Nixon stated that Vietnamization was "irreversible" but that he would respond forcefully to any increase in North Vietnamese military activity.

== February ==
3 February

The United States Senate Committee on Foreign Relations led by Democratic Senator J. William Fulbright reopened hearings on the war. Republican Senator Charles Goodell described Vietnamization as "a great public relations success" but "not a true policy of disengagement."

5 February

Starting at 18:00, Allied forces began a 24-hour Tết ceasefire.

U.S. jets attacked North Vietnamese antiaircraft positions in the Ban Karai Pass after they had fired on U.S. reconnaissance jets.

U.S. helicopter gunships accidentally attacked South Vietnamese Regional Forces test-firing a machine-gun killing eight and wounding 31.

10 February

United States Secretary of Defense Melvin Laird in Saigon for a fact-finding mission said that he was satisfied with the current pace of Vietnamization.

12 February

The PAVN 31st Regiment ambushed a 1st Battalion, 7th Marines patrol near Firebase Ross in the Quế Sơn valley. The U.S. 3rd Battalion, 21st Infantry Regiment was sent to support the Marines. U.S. losses were 13 killed.

14 February

A Gallup poll showed that 55% of Americans opposed an immediate withdrawal from South Vietnam compared to 35% in favor.

16 February

Two ARVN Ranger battalions and the 1st Armored Brigade reported killing 280 PAVN and capturing 36 after a series of encounters over five days 18 miles (29 km) south of Da Nang. ARVN losses were 23 killed.

17 February

Military Policemen were called to a murder scene in an apartment at Fort Bragg. Special Forces Captain Jeffrey R. MacDonald claimed that four intruders attacked his family killing his pregnant wife and two young daughters. The case remains one of the most litigated murder cases in American criminal history.

Testifying before the Senate Foreign Relations Committee, William Colby, head of Civil Operations and Revolutionary Development Support (CORDS) denied that the Phoenix Program was an assassination program, while acknowledging that "some illegal killings" had taken place. Colby stated that in 1969 19,534 suspected VC cadres had been "neutralized" of which 6,187 had been killed, 8,515 captured and 4,832 defected. Colby said "I am neither optimistic nor pessimistic about the future of this program or Vietnam."

18 February

Sergeant Michael Mullen was killed by shrapnel from friendly artillery fire while serving with the 6th Infantry Regiment in Quảng Tín Province. His death prompted his mother Peg Mullen to become an antiwar activist who was profiled by journalist C.D.B. Bryan in The New Yorker in 1976 and the story was subsequently made into the 1979 telemovie Friendly Fire.

USAF B-52 bombers were reported to be bombing PAVN and Pathet Lao forces on the Plain of Jars, the first time the heavy bombers had been used in northern Laos.

19 February

In the Son Thang massacre five U.S. Marines killed five Vietnamese women and 11 children in Sơn Thắng, Quế Sơn Valley. Four of the Marines were charged with murder, two were acquitted and two convicted but only served sentences of one year.

21 February

Despite the U.S. bombing, PAVN and Pathet Lao forces captured Xiangkhouang airfield and most of the Plain of Jars while the Royal Lao Army forces retreated west.

PAVN forces ambushed a mechanized infantry unit from the 196th Light Infantry Brigade in the Quế Sơn valley, killing 14 and wounding 29 in a five hour battle. PAVN losses were four killed.

27 February

A PAVN/VC rocket attack on Bien Hoa Air Base damaged three A-37s, two F-100s and a C-7. Two USAF personnel were killed in these attacks and 74 wounded.

== March ==
9 March

Operational control of U.S. forces in I Corps passed from III Marine Amphibious Corps to XXIV Corps.

11 March

Anti-Vietnamese demonstrations erupted in Phnom Penh, Cambodia while head of state Prince Norodom Sihanouk was touring Europe, the Soviet Union and China. Crowds attacked the North Vietnamese and VC embassies.

12 March

Cambodian prime minister Lon Nol closed the port of Sihanoukville to the North Vietnamese and demanded that all PAVN and VC forces withdraw from Cambodian soil within 72 hours (on 15 March) or face military action.

14 March

The first FTA Show is performed in Fayetteville, North Carolina, near Fort Bragg.

14 March – 12 April

In the SS Columbia Eagle incident, two crewmembers seized the Columbia Eagle with the threat of a bomb and handgun and forced the captain to sail towards Cambodia. Twenty-four of the crew were forced to abandon the ship in lifeboats, while the remaining 13 sailed the ship into Cambodian waters and the two mutineers Clyde McKay Jr. and Alvin Glatkowski surrendered to the Cambodia government which gave them asylum. The mutineers were later arrested and imprisoned in Cambodia, but released later in the year. Glatowski eventually turned himself in to the U.S. Embassy, was extradited to the U.S. and served seven years in prison, while McKay sought refuge with the Khmer Rouge who apparently killed him.

16 March

A U.S. Navy EC-121 Warning Star crashed on landing at Da Nang Air Base. The aircraft struck a hangar and caught fire killing 22 of the 31-man crew.

17 March

The Peers Commission presented their report on the Mỹ Lai massacre. The report found that members of the 23rd Infantry Division had killed at least 175–200 Vietnamese men, women and children and that senior officers at brigade and divisional levels had participated in covering-up the incident.

18 March

The Cambodian National Assembly voted to remove Sihanouk from power with Lon Nol taking the powers of the Head of State on an emergency basis.

19-30 March

Fearing a joint ARVN–Cambodian attack Central Office for South Vietnam began moving from the Cambodia-South Vietnam border area into Kratié Province, Cambodia.

20 March

The PAVN attacked Firebase Granite, the attack was repulsed with 10 U.S. and 10 PAVN killed.

21 March

North Vietnamese Prime Minister Phạm Văn Đồng flew to Beijing to meet with Zhou Enlai and Sihanouk. Sihanouk agreed to accept the leadership of anti-Lon Nol forces under the umbrella of the National United Front of Kampuchea (FUNK).

22 March

The VC bombed a Buddhist meeting in Hóc Môn District killing 14 civilians and wounding 20.

23 March

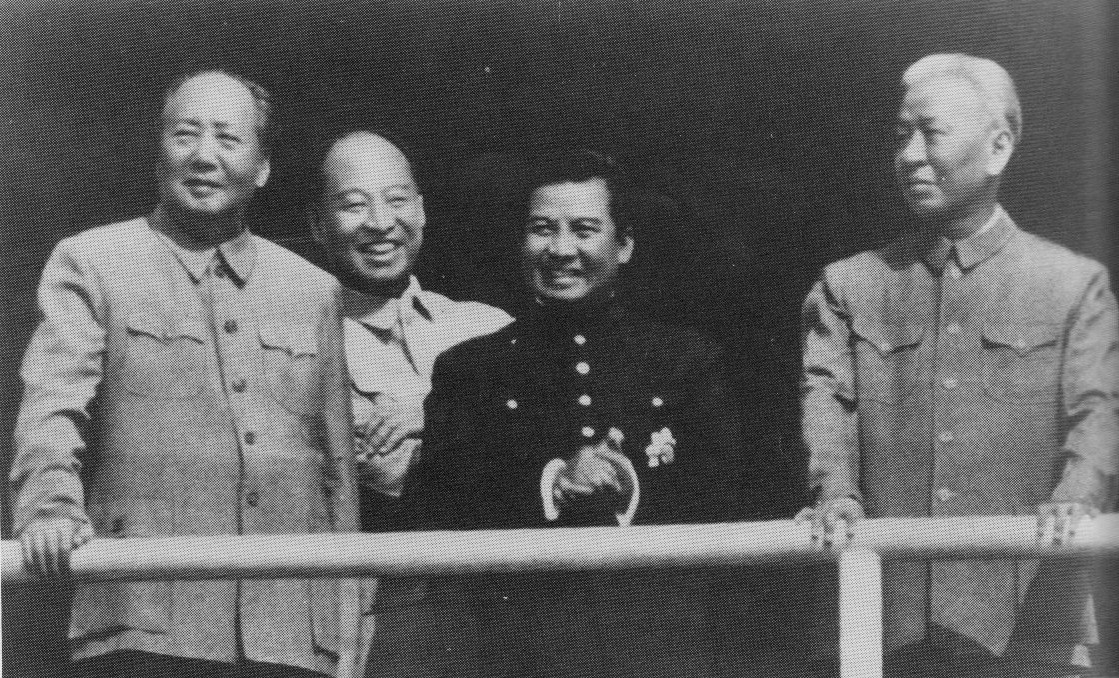
Norodom Sihanouk in Beijing in 1965

Sihanouk on Beijing radio called for a general uprising against Lon Nol and the formation of FUNK.

25 March

North Vietnam withdrew its diplomats from Cambodia.

26 March

North Vietnam refused an offer by South Vietnam for the release and repatriation of 343 wounded or ill prisoners of war, declaring that there were no members of the PAVN in the south. The North Vietnamese representatives at the Paris Peace Talks asserted that the captives were, instead, "illegally arrested patriots" from among South Vietnamese citizens rebelling against the Saigon government.

The South Vietnamese Government began the Land to the Tiller program of land reform designed to redistribute land to tenant farmers and undermine support for the VC.

27-8 March

ARVN Rangers with armored cavalry support and support from U.S. helicopter gunships made the first large-scale South Vietnamese attack into Cambodia attacking a PAVN base in Kandal Province, killing 53 PAVN and capturing one for the loss of three ARVN killed.

28 March

The White House announced that based on the judgment of commanders in the field, U.S. forces could cross into Cambodia in response to PAVN/VC threats. The White House denied that this represented any change in policy or widening of the war.

A U.S. Navy F-4 Phantom II shot down a VPAF MiG-21 while escorting a reconnaissance jet near Thanh Hóa in the first aerial engagement since the November 1968 bombing halt.

29 March

The PAVN 272nd Regiment hit Firebase Jay with mortar, rocket and recoilless rifle fire hitting the command post and knocking out communications. The base was occupied by Companies A and E, 2nd Battalion, 7th Cavalry, B Battery, 2nd Battalion, 12th Artillery and B Battery, 2nd Battalion, 19th Artillery. The PAVN then launched infantry attacks on the base perimeter but were beaten back by dawn. U.S. losses were 13 killed, while 74 PAVN dead were found in and around the base.

The PAVN launched Campaign X against the Cambodian Khmer National Armed Forces (FANK), quickly seizing large portions of the eastern and northeastern parts of the country, isolating and besieging or overrunning a number of Cambodian cities including Kampong Cham.

== April ==
1 April

199th Infantry Brigade commander Brigadier General William R. Bond was killed by sniper fire in Bình Thủy District.

The PAVN hit Firebase Illingworth with over 300 rounds of mortar and recoilless rifle fire and then assaulted the base with a force of over 400 troops. The base was defended by Companies C and E, 2nd Battalion, 8th Cavalry, B Battery, 5th Battalion, 2nd Artillery, A Battery, 1st Battalion, 30th Artillery, A Battery, 2nd Battalion, 32nd Artillery and B Battery, 1st Battalion, 77th Artillery. During the attack an ammunition dump containing over 190 rounds exploded. By 05:00 the attack had been repulsed at a cost of 24 U.S. killed and 54 wounded and 88 PAVN killed.

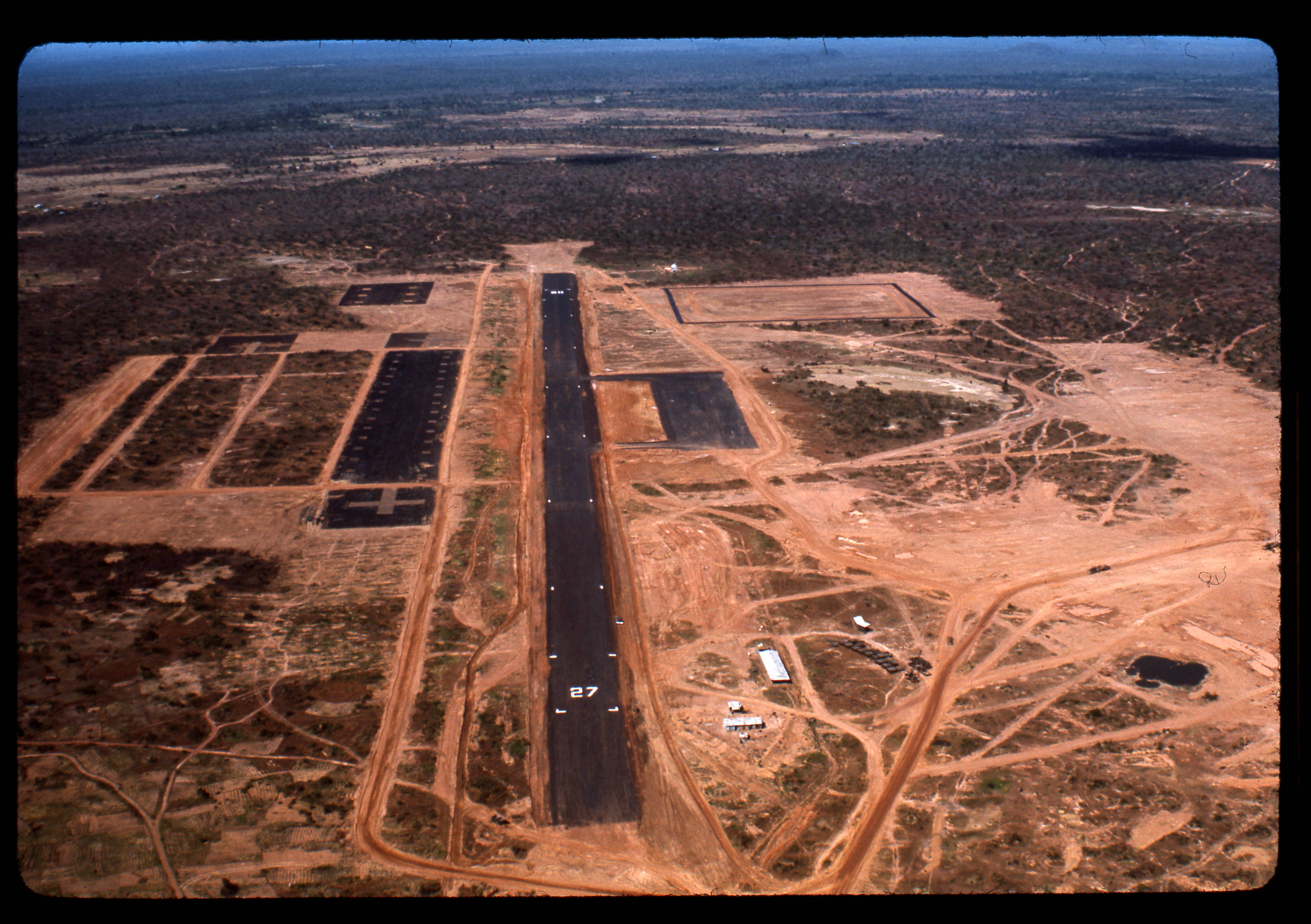
Song Mao Base Camp

Three PAVN battalions attacked Song Mao Base Camp which was defended by the U.S. 2nd Squadron, 1st Cavalry and the ARVN 44th Regiment, 23rd Division. The attack was repulsed resulting in two U.S., two ARVN and 151 PAVN killed.

1 April to 8 May

The PAVN besiege Dak Seang Camp. On 15 April 1970 the 170th Assault Helicopter Company dropped the 3rd Battalion, 42nd ARVN Regiment into a landing zone near Dak Seang, resulting in the loss of two helicopters.

1 April to 5 September

Operation Texas Star was a military operation of the U.S. 101st Airborne Division and the Army of the Republic of Vietnam (ARVN) 1st Division against PAVN logistics routes and bases in the A Shau Valley and the mountains east of the valley. The operation culminated in the Battle of Fire Support Base Ripcord. The operation resulted in 1,782 PAVN killed and five captured, U.S. losses were 386 killed and ARVN losses were 370 killed.

4 April

A group of 50,000 demonstrators picketed in Washington D.C. in the "March for Victory", organized by fundamentalist radio evangelist Carl McIntire. The marchers, mostly middle-aged white Americans, protested Nixon's decision to reduce the American commitment rather than to take the war into North Vietnam.

5 April

Photojournalist Gilles Caron disappeared on Highway 1 in Cambodia. He was the first of 25 journalists to disappear or be killed by the Khmer Rouge/PAVN between 5 April and 28 October 1970.

6 April

Photojournalists Sean Flynn and Dana Stone disappeared on Highway 1 in Cambodia. Later investigations revealed that they were captured by the PAVN and then handed over to the Khmer Rouge who executed them.

6-10 April

The PAVN/VC attacked Khmer National Army (ANK) forces near Chiphou in Svay Rieng Province killing 20 with 30 more missing. The ANK claimed to have killed 300 PAVN/VC on 9 April, but the ANK then withdrew all its forces from the Parrot's Beak region of Svay Rieng Province abandoning it to the PAVN/VC and forming a new defensive line at Prasot village, where the ANK killed numerous ethnic Vietnamese.

7 April

Nixon awarded 21 posthumous Medals of Honor to U.S. servicemen killed in the war.

10 April

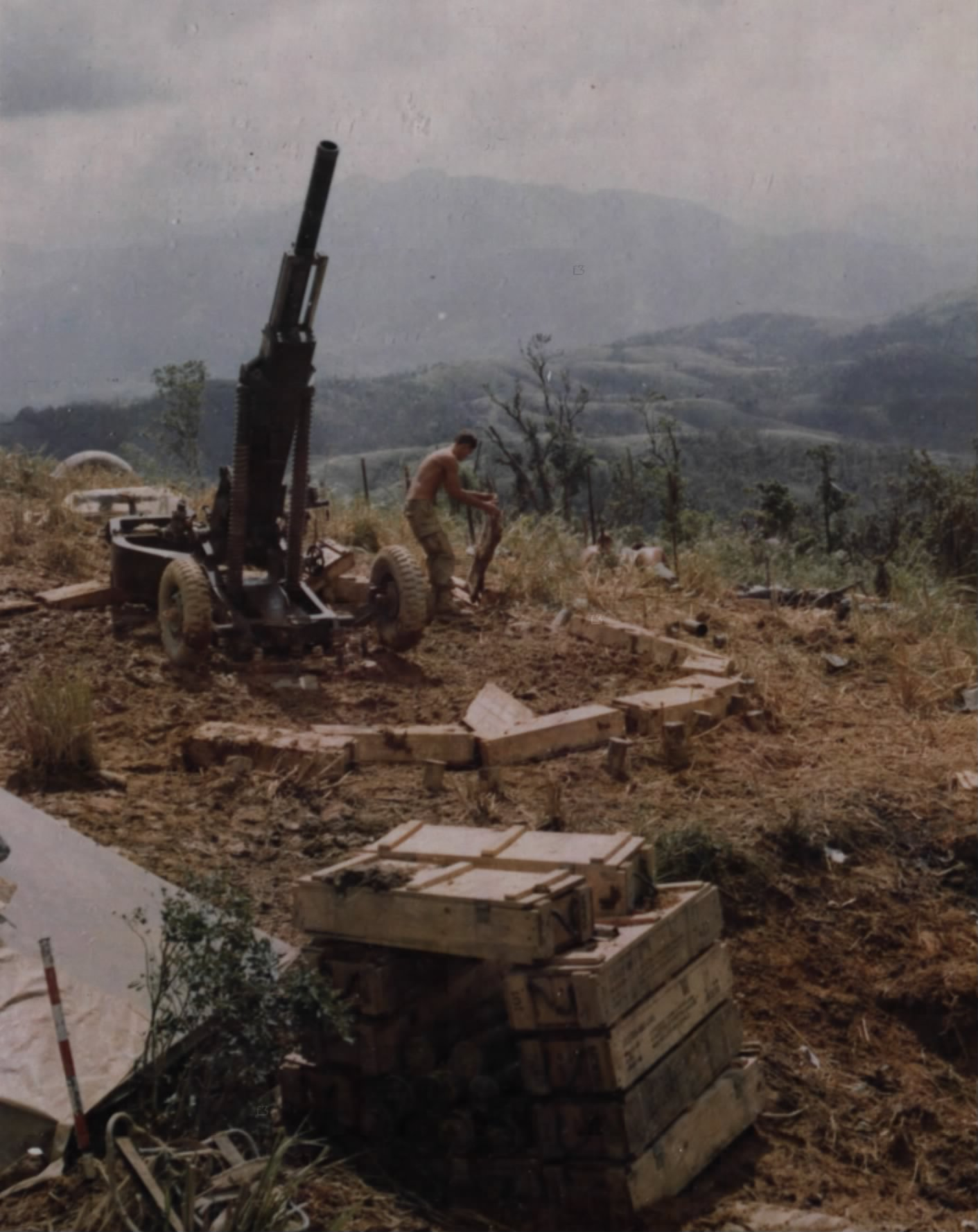
U.S. artillery at Mai Loc Camp

Following a mortar and rocket-propelled grenade barrage, PAVN sappers attacked Mai Loc Camp which was defended by CIDG forces and a U.S. artillery unit. The PAVN withdrew with 19 dead, while U.S. losses were six and 14 CIDG were killed.

11 April

A Gallup poll showed that 48% of Americans approved of Nixon's Vietnam policy while 41% disapproved.

12 April - May

Two PAVN battalions attacked Dak Pek Camp and the defenders were forced back to a small fighting position before air support forced the PAVN back. The PAVN then besieged the camp until early May when they withdrew. Total losses were 34 CIDG and 420 PAVN killed.

13 April

In the village of Xom Bien, a massacre of about 600 Vietnamese Cambodians was carried out by the ANK as part of a campaign by the Lon Nol government against the nation's Vietnamese-speaking minority. Shortly after midnight, troops entered the village, founded as a Roman Catholic mission on the waters of the Mekong River in the Chrouy Changvar area near Phnom Penh and removed the men and boys and shot them. Days later, hundreds of the corpses of the victims (which included more from outside of Xom Bien) were seen floating down the Mekong into South Vietnam.

A PAVN sapper company attacked Firebase Nancy defended by a unit of the ARVN 1st Regiment, 1st Division and a U.S. artillery unit, returned fire and the PAVN withdrew. At dusk ARVN soldiers sweeping the perimeter made sporadic contact with PAVN. PAVN losses were 71 killed and nine captured and 11 individual and six crew-served weapons captured; U.S. losses were four killed.

14 April

Lon Nol appealed for foreign military assistance to counter the PAVN/VC.

14-7 April

Operation Toan Thang 41 was a 3rd Brigade, 25th Infantry Division, ARVN 49th Regiment, 31st, 36th and 52nd Ranger Battalions and 10th and 18th Armored Cavalry operation against a PAVN logistics and rest area in the Angel's Wing, Svay Rieng Province, Cambodia. The operation resulted in 378 PAVN/VC killed.

15 April

A VC booby-trap made from a 105mm shell detonated ammunition at a U.S. camp near Đức Phổ killing 14 Americans from the 11th Infantry Brigade and wounding 32.

16 April

The PAVN 95C Regiment attacked Firebase Atkinson which was defended by Companies B and E, 2nd Battalion, 7th Cavalry and B Battery, 2nd Battalion, 19th Artillery. The PAVN attacks were beaten back with seven U.S. and 66 PAVN killed.

20 April

Nixon announced that he would order the withdrawal of a further 150,000 American troops from South Vietnam over the next 12 months as part of the process of turning conduct of the war over to the South Vietnamese.

20-3 April

Operation Cuu Long/SD9/06 was conducted by elements of the ARVN 9th Infantry Division attacking 6 km (3.7 mi) into Cambodia west of the "Crow's Nest". The ARVN claimed 187 PAVN/VC killed and over 1,000 weapons captured for a cost of 24 killed. Thirty CH-47 sorties were flown to remove captured weapons and ammunition before it was decided to destroy the remainder in situ. The ARVN force returned to South Vietnam on 23 April.

22 April

In a meeting at the White House of his National Security Council, Nixon discussed the options for the U.S. response to the continuing use of Cambodia by the PAVN/VC as a base. National security adviser, Henry Kissinger, would recount later that the three choices were to continue the current response, favored by Secretary of Defense Laird and Secretary of State William P. Rogers; providing financial and adviser aid to an invasion by the ARVN without committing ground troops (favored by Kissinger); or sending U.S. troops and planes into Cambodia to attack the sanctuaries (favored by General Earle Wheeler, the Chairman of the Joint Chiefs of Staff). While Nixon supported Kissinger's option, U.S. Vice President Spiro T. Agnew made the argument for committing U.S. troops to Cambodia, the decision that Nixon ultimately adopted

23 April

Nixon issued an Executive Order ending any future deferment from the military draft based on occupation, agriculture or fatherhood.

24-5 April

At a conference near Canton, Sihanouk, Souphanouvong, Phạm Văn Đồng and Nguyễn Hữu Thọ pledged to jointly oppose the U.S.. The resolution was endorsed by Zhou Enlai.

27 April

Two Marine A-4 Skyhawks accidentally bombed a CIDG unit during a battle 77 miles (124 km) southwest of Da Nang killing ten and wounding 20.

28 April

Kien Tuong Province Regional Forces with support from the 9th Division attacked 3 km (1.9 mi) into the "Crow's Nest" again in a two-day operation, reportedly killing 43 PAVN/VC and capturing two for the loss of two killed. During the same period the Regional Forces also raided northwest of Kampong Rou District killing 43 PAVN/VC and capturing 88 for the loss of 2 killed.

The Senate Foreign Relations Committee announced its opposition to extending U.S. military aid to Cambodia.

29 April

The PAVN again attacked Firebase Granite, the attack was repulsed with seven U.S. killed and one missing and 18 PAVN killed.

29 April – 22 July

The Cambodian Campaign (also known as the Cambodian Incursion) was a series of military operations conducted in eastern Cambodia by the U.S. and the South Vietnam. A total of 13 major operations were conducted by the ARVN and U.S. forces between 1 May and 30 June. In addition to the capture of large amounts of supplies and equipment 11,369 PAVN/VC were killed and 2,328 captured, ARVN losses were 638 killed and 35 missing and U.S. losses were 338 killed and 13 missing.

30 April

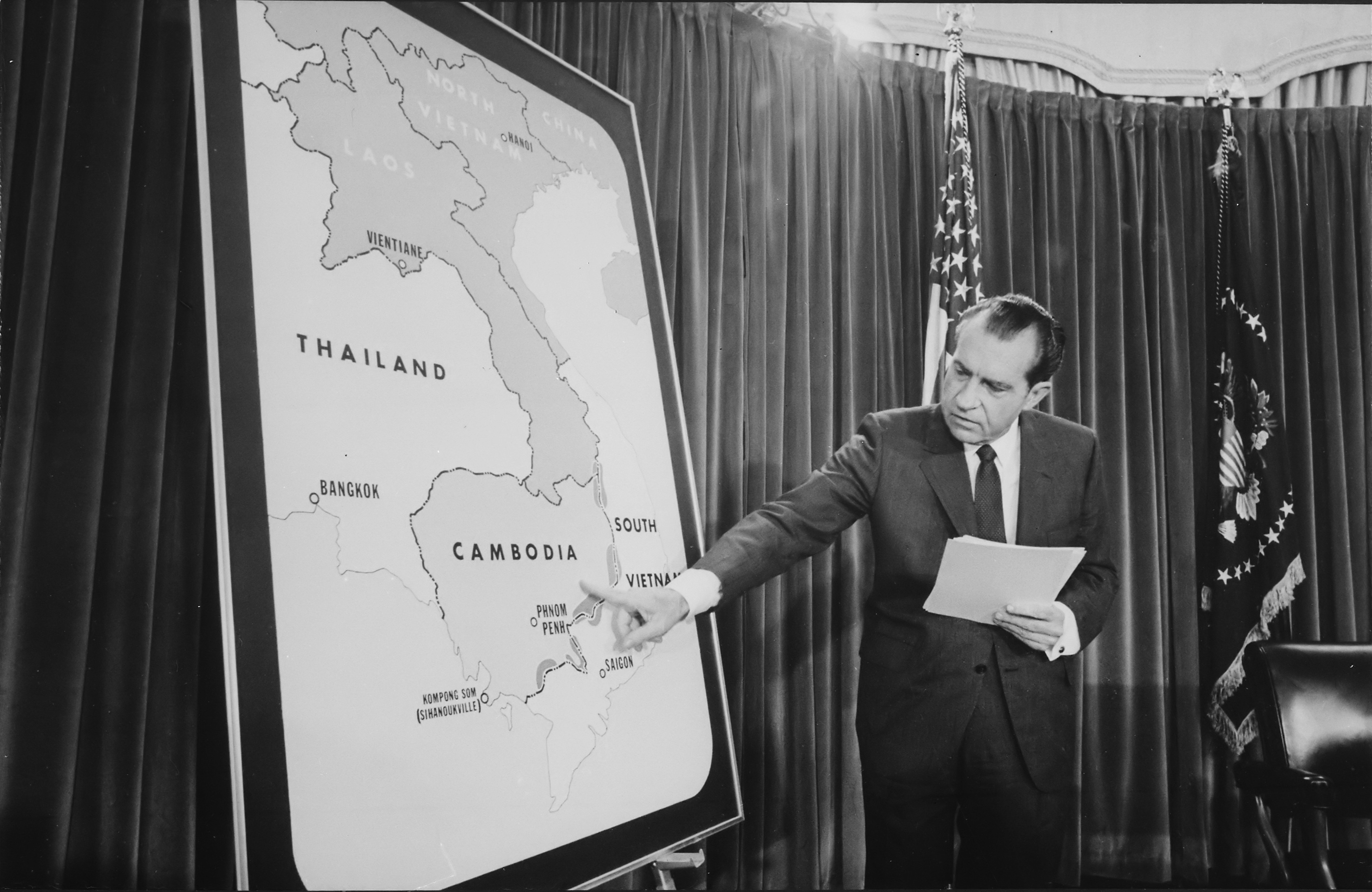
President Nixon announces the Cambodian Incursion

In a nationally televised address, Nixon announced that he had sent 2,000 American combat troops into Cambodia and ordered U.S. B-52 bombers to begin airstrikes. Nixon reversed his April 20 announcement that he would withdraw 150,000 troops from Vietnam over the next year, in effect providing that there would again be a need to draft young American men to maintain the current force level. Nixon told viewers "This is not an invasion of Cambodia." rather the attacks were upon territory in Cambodia that were "completely occupied and controlled by North Vietnamese forces."

30 April to 4 May

A PAVN regiment captured Hiệp Đức District and ARVN and U.S. forces ejected them resulting in 219 PAVN, 12 ARVN and seven U.S. killed.

== May ==
1 May

Operation Toan Thang IV a multi-division U.S./ARVN operation in III Corps concludes. U.S. losses are 685 killed while PAVN/VC losses are 14,479 killed.

Protests against the expansion of the war into Cambodia began on U.S. college campuses.

For the first time in more than 50 years, the U.S. Senate Foreign Relations Committee voted to ask for a meeting with a U.S. president, after having been given no notice of the invasion, and the request was unanimous from both political parties.

1-2 May

U.S. aircraft bombed PAVN supply depots in Nghệ An and Quảng Bình Provinces. The Nixon Administration described the raids as defensive.

3 May

A PAVN artillery and sapper attack on Firebase Betty resulted in five U.S. killed and 25 wounded.

4 May

Four college students were shot and killed at Ohio's Kent State University, and nine others wounded by Ohio National Guardsmen, during a protest against the incursion into Cambodia.

4-5 May

A PAVN rocket attack on Chu Lai Air Base resulted in 12 U.S. killed and 33 wounded.

5 May

Sihanouk announced from Beijing that he had formed a government-in-exile that would ally with the Communist government of China and the Khmer Rouge to overthrow head of state Lon Nol. Sihanouk's group was called "GRUNK" and was a coalition of government officials exiled in China (former premier Penn Nouth as the Prime Minister) and Khmer Rouge leaders within Cambodia, chief of whom was Khmer Rouge leader Khieu Samphan.

China severed diplomatic relations with Cambodia.

Nixon met with Congressional leaders and pledged that U.S. forces would be withdrawn from Cambodia within seven weeks and that he would not allow them to penetrate deeper than 21 miles (34 km) without Congressional preapproval.

6 May

At 05:00 the PAVN 33rd Sapper Battalion attacked Firebase Henderson south of Ca Lu, Quảng Trị Province, which was occupied by elements of the 2nd Battalion, 501st Infantry Regiment, 2nd Battalion, 11th Artillery, 326th Engineer Battalion and ARVN units. The attack resulted in 27 U.S., 3 ARVN and 29 PAVN killed.

The PAVN/VC attacked Quế Sơn District Headquarters with mortar fire followed by a battalion-sized ground attack. Marines of Company H, 2nd Battalion, 5th Marines, supported by artillery aided the besieged RF/PF units. The RF/PF lost 10 killed, the Marines one killed and the PAVN/VC 27 killed.

More than 100 colleges and universities across the U.S. shut down as a result of students protests over the Cambodian Incursion and the Kent State shootings.

7 May

The PAVN attacked Firebase Maureen which was defended by a platoon of the 1st Battalion, 506th Infantry.

8 May

Thiệu announced that he had reached an agreement in principle with Lon Nol for South Vietnamese combat operations in eastern Cambodia. Unlike the U.S. forces, the South Vietnamese would not be restricted in time or by geographical limits.

A group of 500 construction workers attacked a group of 1,000 student antiwar protesters outside of New York City Hall, near the intersection of Wall Street and Broad Street. More than 60 people were injured.

9 May

Hours before a large anti-war protest began at Washington, D.C., Nixon surprised most of his Secret Service bodyguards and about eight demonstrators by walking in to the Lincoln Memorial at 4:55 in the morning. The Associated Press described it as a "strange encounter, unique in recent political annals." As word got around that Nixon was chatting with students, the group had increased to 50 by the time he left, and his parting words were "Go shout your slogans on the Ellipse. Just keep it peaceful." Later in the day, a crowd of about 100,000 demonstrated peacefully in the event organized by the New Mobilization Committee to End the War in Vietnam in one of many anti-war protests that took place across the nation that day.

12 May

Major General John A. B. Dillard and eight others were killed when their helicopter was shot down southwest of Pleiku.

Kỳ announced that Republic of Vietnam Navy boats were blockading the Cambodian coastline to prevent the PAVN/VC from being resupplied by sea.

Lair announced that Vietnamization was progressing so well that U.S. forces would cease to be involved in combat by the end of June 1971.

15 May

Police shot and killed two students and injured 12 more in the Jackson State killings at Jackson State College, Mississippi.

16 May

22-year-old Specialist 4 James E. Paul fired a rifle at other American soldiers as they waited in bleachers to see a stage show in Tây Ninh. Two people were killed and ten others were wounded. Paul was convicted of two counts of murder and sentenced to 22 years in prison.

19 May

A PAVN rocket attack on Pleiku Air Base destroyed an EC-47 and damaged two more.

20 May

A pro-war rally attracted 150,000 people to New York's City Hall Park, with a crowd that included blue collar workers and union members who supported the Nixon administration's policies in the war.

Chinese Communist Party Chairman Mao Zedong, the de facto leader of the People's Republic of China, issued a statement to his people for the first time in five years, with Radio Peking delivering the word to listeners nationwide. Urging Chinese citizens to work together "to defeat U.S. imperialism" in Vietnam and Cambodia, Mao's statement declared, "People of the world, unite and defeat the U.S. aggressors and all their running dogs!" Mao went on to say that "Nixon's fascist atrocities have kindled the raging flames of the revolutionary mass movement" and added that "The Chinese people firmly support the revolutionary struggle of the American people", predicting that "the fascist rule in the United States will inevitably be defeated."

27 May

South Vietnamese and Cambodian diplomats sign agreements reestablishing diplomatic relations between South Vietnam and Cambodia, providing for economic and military cooperation and protecting ethic Vietnamese in Cambodia.

28 May

The National League of POW/MIA Families flag

The National League of POW/MIA Families was incorporated by a group of wives of American servicemen who were listed as prisoners of war or missing in action in the war.

31 May

PAVN/VC troops who had captured positions in Dalat withdrew evading South Vietnamese forces. The PAVN/VC lost 47 killed while ARVN losses were 16 killed.

== June ==
1-3 June

The PAVN 9th Battalion, 66th Regiment struck Firebase Tun Tavern (16.567°N 106.935°E) with mortar fire followed by a ground attack. The defenders returned fire supported by artillery, helicopter gunships and airstrikes. PAVN losses were 136 killed while ARVN losses were 41 killed and U.S. losses two killed.

3 June

Nixon announced in a nationwide television and radio address that American troops would be pulled back out of Cambodia after the achievement of "all our major military objectives", and that half of the 31,000 U.S. troops in Cambodia had been returned to fight in South Vietnam.

6 June

In a speech to the Cambodian parliament, Kỳ states that South Vietnam has no territorial aims in Cambodia and will send military support whenever requested.

8 June

In a speech in Hanoi, Sihanouk states that Cambodians will fight with the Vietnamese against U.S. imperialism.

10 June

The song War by Edwin Starr was released.

11 June

The VC killed 78 South Vietnamese civilians in Thanh My hamlet, Phu Thanh village, Quảng Nam Province in the Thanh My massacre.

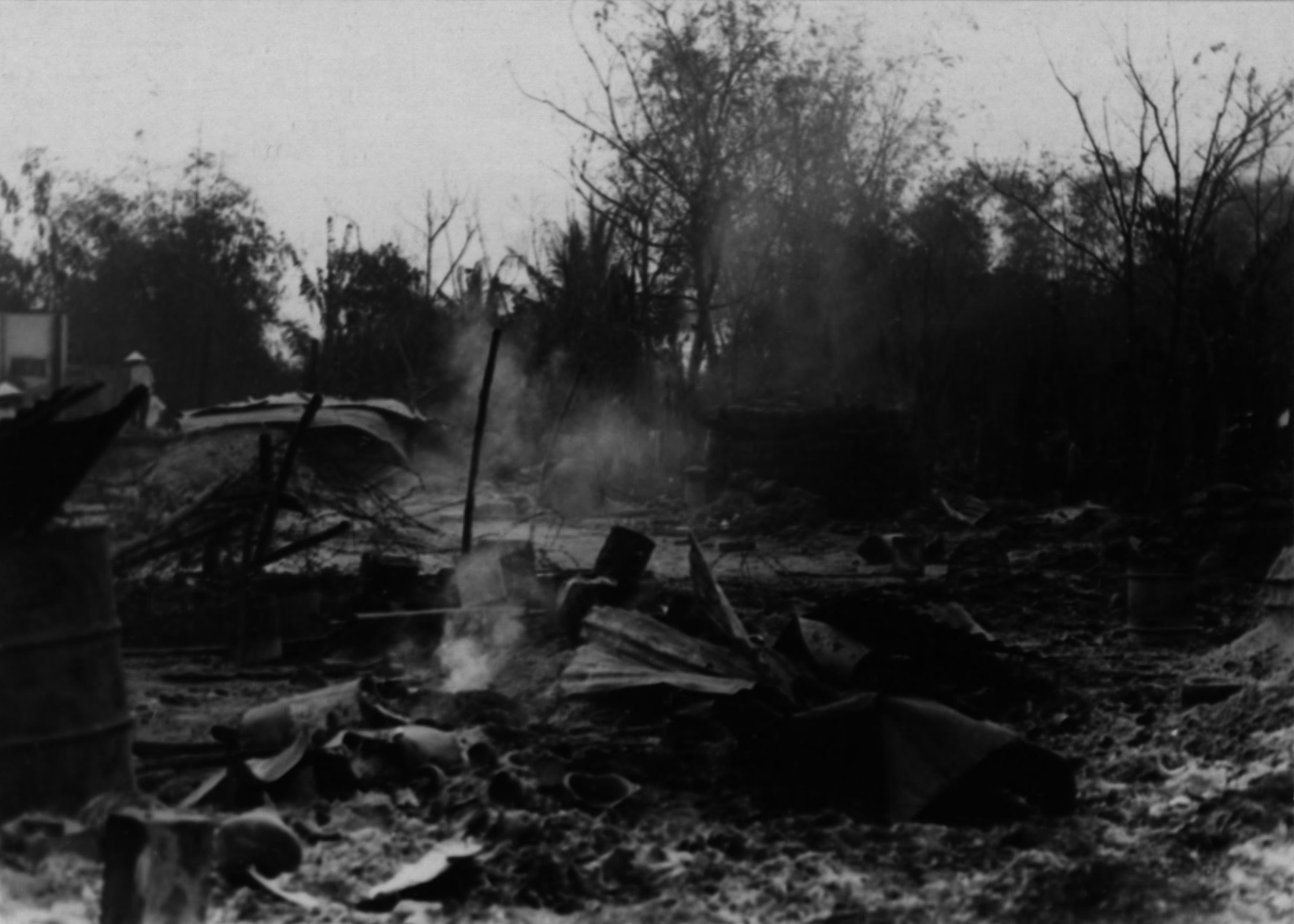
Aftermath of the Thanh My massacre

12-16 June

In the Battle of Kompong Speu a combined forces of the ARVN and ANK fought to recapture the provincial capital of Kompong Speu. The town was captured by PAVN/VC forces on June 13 but was retaken by Allied forces on June 16. 183 PAVN, four ARVN and 40-50 civilians are killed in the fighting.

15 June

The Battle of Prey Veng was part of the ARVN's campaign in Cambodia. It took place in Prey Veng on June 15, 1970, where ARVN and Cambodian troops battled the PAVN/VC. It ended with an Allied victory with 110 PAVN and 13 ARVN killed.

16-21 June

PAVN attacks almost completely isolated Phnom Penh, severing Highways 1 and 4 and cutting the railway line to the Thai border.

22 June

Đặng Thùy Trâm a 27 year old PAVN doctor and a colleague were killed near Đức Phổ, Quảng Ngãi Province by a patrol from the U.S. 4th Battalion, 21st Infantry Regiment in a Free-fire zone. Two of her diaries recovered by U.S. forces were later published under the title Nhật ký Đặng Thùy Trâm (Đặng Thùy Trâm's Diary (Last Night I Dreamed Of Peace)).

24 June

The United States Senate voted to repeal the Gulf of Tonkin Resolution that had supported U.S. intervention in the Vietnam War since 1964.

26 June

Laird confirmed that U.S. bombing of Cambodia would continue after the 30 June date for withdrawal of U.S. forces.

27 June

Cambodian forces abandoned Ratanakiri Province to the PAVN/VC.

29 June

The last U.S. ground troops withdrew from Cambodia.

29 June to 1 March 1971

The 198th Light Infantry Brigade launched Operation Pennsylvania Square in Quảng Tín Province. The operation resulted in 264 PAVN/VC killed and 13 captured, U.S. losses were 20 killed.

30 June

Naval Support Activity Danang was deactivated and its role taken over by U.S. Army units.

Nixon described the operation in Cambodia as successful, while stating that in future the defense of Cambodia would be the responsibility of Cambodia and its allies without U.S. ground forces.

The U.S. Senate voted 58:37 to approve the Cooper–Church Amendment to end funding to retain U.S. ground troops and military advisors in Cambodia and Laos after 30 June 1970; bar air operations in Cambodian airspace in direct support of Cambodian forces without congressional approval and end U.S. support for South Vietnamese forces outside territorial South Vietnam.

== July ==
In response to North Vietnam's support of Soviet Union in the Sino-Soviet split China removes its final anti-aircraft troops from North Vietnam.

1 July

Nixon named diplomat David K.E. Bruce to head the U.S. delegation to the Paris Peace Talks.

1-23 July

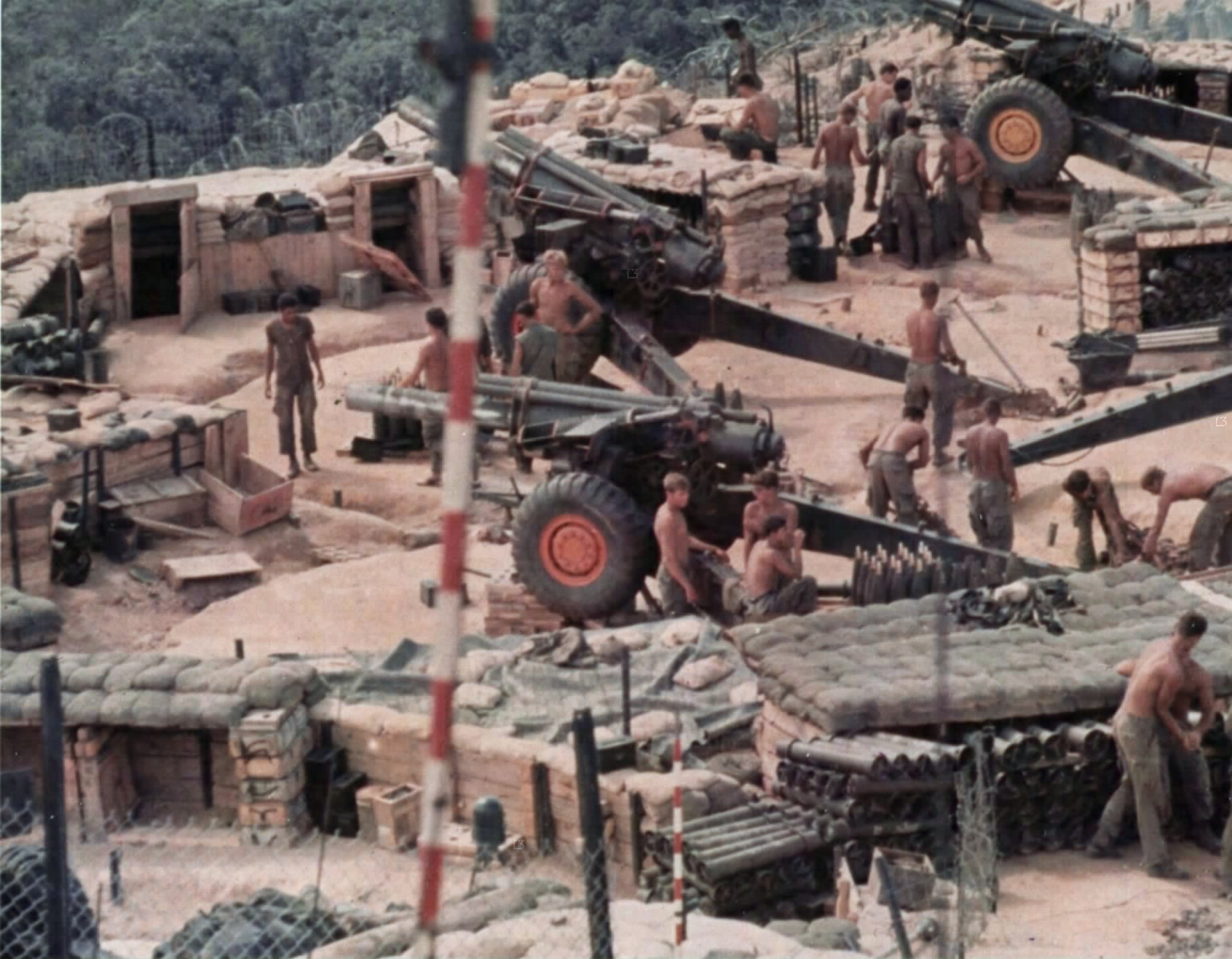
U.S. artillery at Firebase Ripcord

The Battle of Fire Support Base Ripcord was a 23-day battle between the 2nd Battalion, 506th Infantry Regiment, 101st Airborne Division and the PAVN 324B Division from 1 to 23 July. The battle resulted in 422 PAVN and 75 U.S. killed.

2 July

To unify command and strengthen the administration of the South Vietnamese military Thiệu incorporated the Regional and Popular Forces into the ARVN and redesignated Corps Tactical Zones as Military Regions (MRs). Under the reorganization the Corps deputy commander conducted major offensive operations in the MR while the MR deputy commander, in charge of territorial defense and pacification, commanded the RFs and PFs. Concurrently, MACV and the Joint General Staff completed plans to incorporate the CIDGs into ARVN Border Defense Ranger Battalions.

While on a congressional tour of the South Vietnamese prison on Côn Sơn Island, aide Tom Harkin photographed the "tiger cages" which were used to hold communist cadres, the photos were published in Life Magazine on 17 July 1970 causing international outrage.

2-17 July

Operation Maeng Da was an RLA operation against the PAVN logistics hub at Tchepone. The PAVN 9th Regiment offered stiff resistance and the RLA were forced to withdraw having only temporarily interrupted PAVN supply routes.

3 July

The Hải Lăng PF Platoon; RF group 1/11 and Companies 121 and 122; and CAPs 4-3-2 and 4-1-2, located 9 km southeast of Quảng Trị, were attacked by a PAVN/VC force. Supported by gunships and artillery, the Marines/ARVN killed 135 PAVN/VC and captured 74 weapons while losing 16 killed and six missing.

7 July

1st Cavalry Division commander Major General George W. Casey and six others were killed when their helicopter crashed into a mountain in poor weather.

8 July

At 11:30, elements of Troop A, 2/17th Cavalry attacked a 250 strong PAVN force from the 1st and 2nd Battalions, 9th Regiment 4 km southwest of Khe Sanh. The PAVN withdrew after eight hours leaving 139 dead and four captured; U.S. losses were four killed.

9 July

The Cooper-Church Amendment was defeated 237:153 in the U.S. House of Representatives.

9-15 July

The 1st Brigade, 101st Airborne Division and the ARVN 3rd Regiment, 1st Division launched Operation Clinch Valley to engage the PAVN 9th Regiment on the Khe Sanh plateau. The operation resulted in 266 PAVN killed.

11 July

A CH-53D was hit by a surface to air missile and crashed near Quảng Trị, killing three crewmen and 45 South Vietnamese Marines.

12 July - 29 September

The 196th Infantry Brigade launched Operation Elk Canyon near Khâm Đức, Quảng Tín Province. The operation resulted in 107 PAVN killed and one captured, U.S. losses were 37 killed.

16 July - 24 August

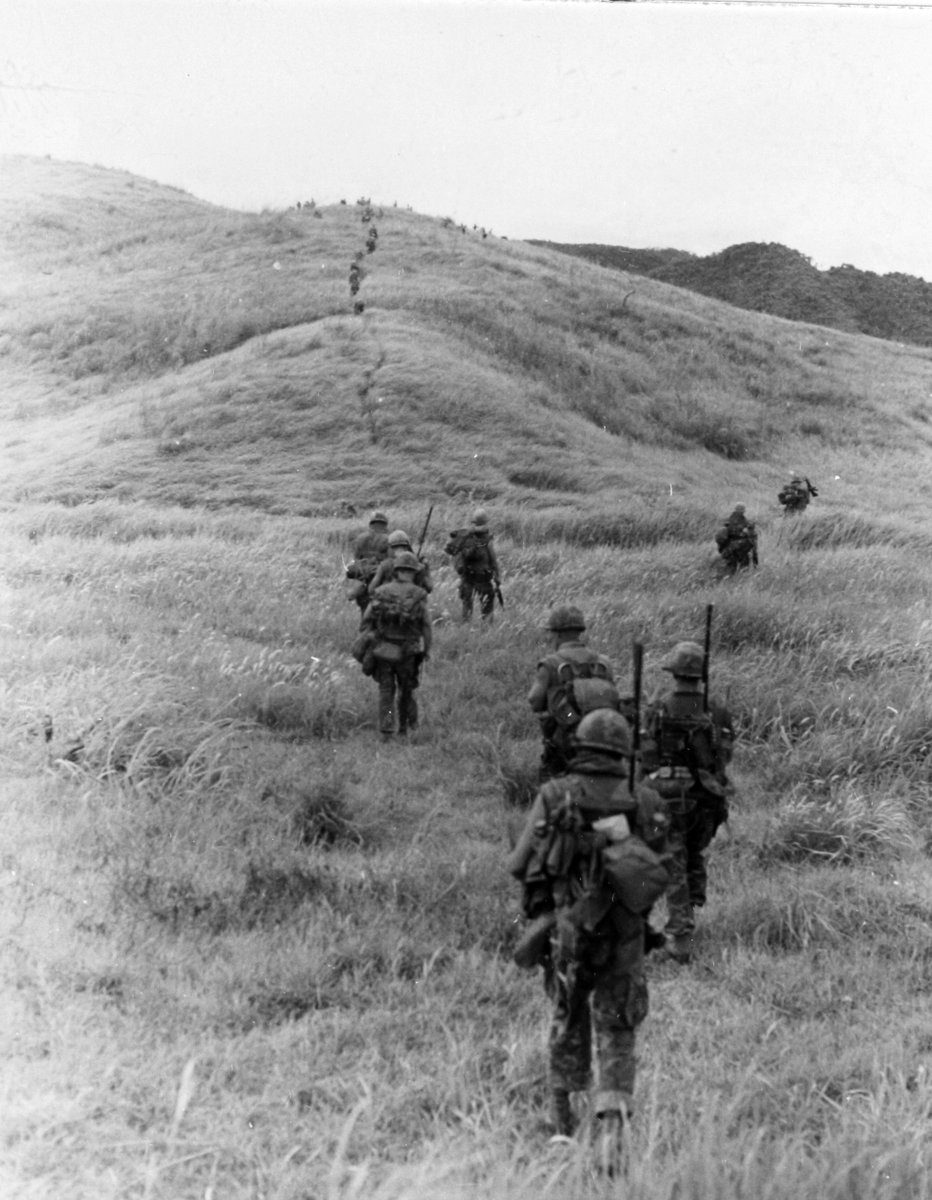
Company B, 1/7 Marines patrol during Operation Pickens Forest

The 1st Marine Division launched Operation Pickens Forest to attack PAVN base areas in the mountains of Quảng Nam Province. The operation resulted in 99 PAVN killed; Marine losses were four killed.

22 July - 30 January 1971

The 1st Battalion, 11th Infantry Regiment and elements of the ARVN 1st Division launched Operation Wolfe Mountain to conduct reconnaissance in force, rocket suppression and night ambush operations in Quảng Trị Province. The operation resulted in 242 PAVN killed, U.S. losses were 27 killed.

24 July - 11 August

The 1st Brigade, 101st Airborne Division and the ARVN 1st Division launched Operation Chicago Peak in the A Shau Valley. The operation resulted in 99 PAVN killed and 3 ARVN killed.

31 July

Thiệu declared that there was no change to South Vietnam's peace conditions and ruled out any coalition government with the VC other one formed after internationally supervised elections.

== August ==
August 1970-February 1971

Operation Chenla I was an operation involving the ANK launched the operation during late August 1970 with limited air support from the ARVN and Republic of Vietnam Air Force. The operation was terminated in February 1971, after the Cambodian High Command made a decision to withdraw some units from Tang Kauk to protect Phnom Penh after Pochentong Airbase was attacked. The objective of the operation was to reconnect Skoun and Kompong Cham along Route 7, which was repeatedly attacked by PAVN/VC forces.

4 August

ARVN forces killed 44 PAVN/VC in the Mekong Delta for the loss of six killed.

9 August - 7 October

In the siege of Firebase O'Reilly 570 PAVN were killed for the loss of 61 ARVN and two U.S.

12-15 August

ARVN units Principally Regional and Popular Forces) killed over 285 PAVN and captured 33 for the loss of 21 killed in scattered fighting southeast of Quảng Trị.

19 August

The U.S. and Cambodia signed a military aid package for $40 million worth of equipment and training for the period to 30 June 1971.

21 August A VC mortar attack on the village of Bo Chuc in the Mekong Delta killed 11 civilians and wounded 42.

24 August

A bomb exploded next to Sterling Hall, University of Wisconsin aimed at destroying the Army Mathematics Research Center killing researcher Robert Fassnacht.

26 August

At the end of Operation Elk Canyon a CH-47 (#67-18445) carrying personnel and munitions came in for landing at Landing Zone Judy (15.37°N 108.08°E) when it was hit by PAVN fire and crashed in flames killing 30 onboard and 1 soldier on the ground.

27 August

In a speech at the end of a visit to South Vietnam Agnew praised the South Vietnamese and said there would be no reduction in U.S. support.

28 August

Thailand announced that it planned to withdraw its forces from South Vietnam.

29 August

The Chicano Moratorium against the war began in East Los Angeles. A parade through the streets quickly became violent and three days of rioting followed, spreading into South Los Angeles and into Wilmington, California.

The VC attacked a Buddhist orphanage south of Da Nang killing 15 civilians and wounding 45.

30 August

The South Vietnamese Senate election was held and two-thirds of the eligible voters participated despite random attacks on polling places by the PAVN/VC. The polling was for 30 of the 60 seats in the Senate. At least 11 voters were killed, most of them in the Bình Định Province.

A PAVN/VC rocket attack on Cam Ranh Base destroyed two 420,000 gallon jet fuel storage tanks.

31 August

Buddhist candidates won 10 of the 30 Senate seats, however Catholics controlled 30 seats despite being a minority in South Vietnam.

31 August - 25 September

Operation Honorable Dragon was an offensive by six RLA battalions to capture Pakse Site 26 and disrupt the Ho Chi Minh Trail.

== September ==
1 September

The U.S. Senate voted against the McGovern–Hatfield Amendment by Senators George S. McGovern (D-South Dakota) and Mark O. Hatfield (R-Oregon) to force President Nixon to withdraw all American troops from Indochina by mid-1971. The vote had 39 supporters (including seven Republicans) and 55 voting against it.

1 September - 7 May 1971

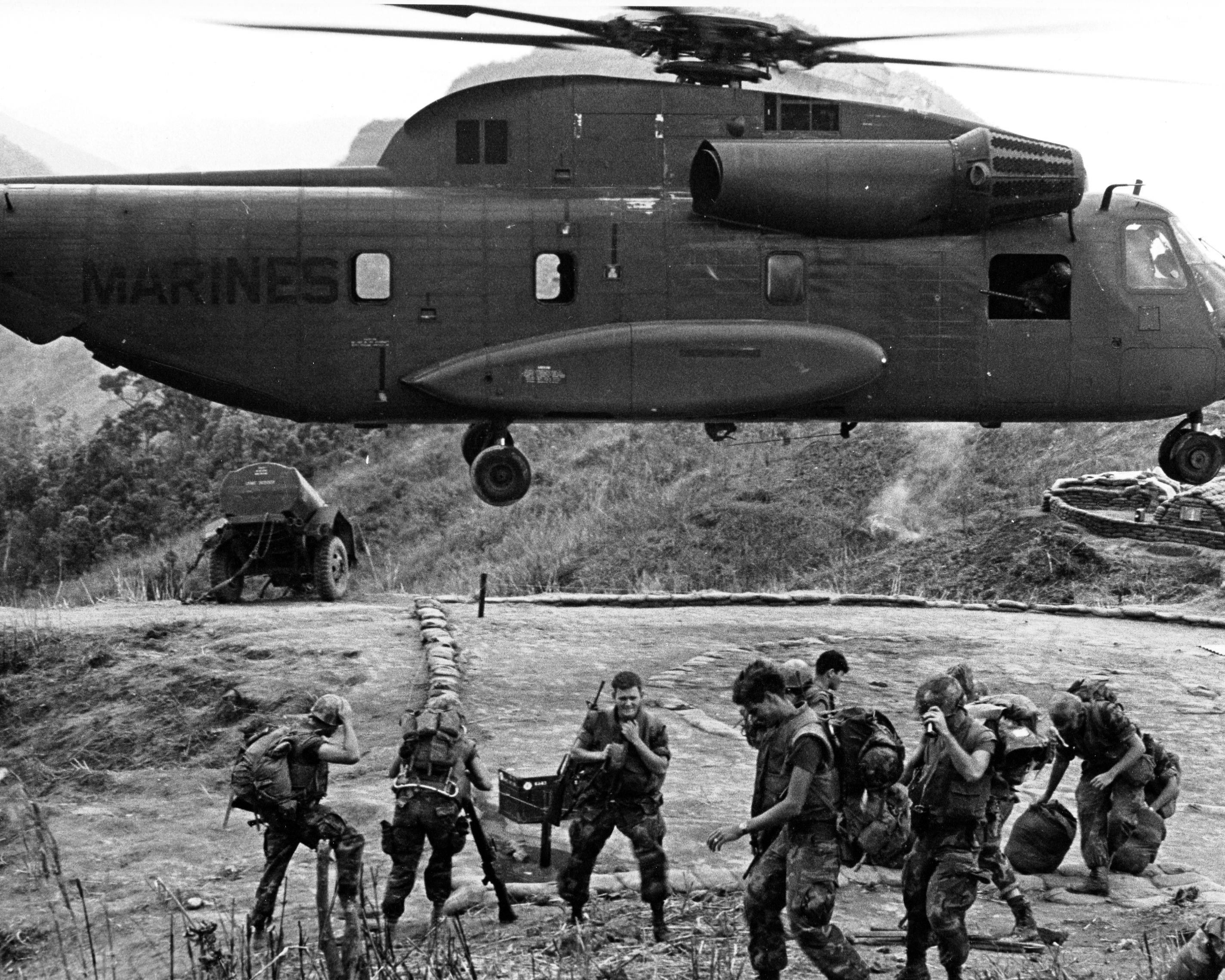
Elements of the 1st Battalion, 5th Marines await a heli-lift during Operation Imperial Lake

Operation Imperial Lake, a United States Marine Corps, Republic of Korea Marine Corps and U.S. Army operation in the Quế Sơn District, Quảng Nam Province begins. It was the last operation of the U.S. 1st Marine Division during the war. The operation resulted in 296 PAVN killed and 24 U.S. killed.

3 September

North Vietnam's lead negotiator Xuân Thủy returned to the Paris Peace Talks after walking out in December 1969, however he stated that North Vietnam's negotiating position remained unchanged requiring and unconditional U.S. withdrawal and abandoning the Saigon government.

4 September

VC attacked a South Vietnamese training center in Bình Định Province, killing 14.

5 September - 8 October 1971

Operation Jefferson Glenn, an operation by the 101st Airborne Division and the ARVN 1st Division to shield critical installations in Huế and Da Nang began. It was the last operation of the 101st Airborne during the war. the operation resulted in 2,026 PAVN/VC killed.

7 September

Kissinger held his first secret talks with North Vietnamese negotiators in Paris and made no progress.

An unsuccessful assassination attempt was made against the newly-arrived U.S. Ambassador to Cambodia Emory C. Swank when a bicycle-bomb failed to detonate next to his car.

9 September

An ANK amphibious force of 1,500 men broke the siege of Kompong Thom after three months, driving away the PAVN and Khmer Rouge forces.

200 PAVN/VC attacked Trà Bồng District headquarters killing 24 ARVN and one U.S. adviser.

11–13 September

Operation Tailwind was a covert incursion into southeastern Laos by a company-sized element of U.S. Army Special Forces and Montagnard commando (Hatchet Force) of the Military Assistance Command, Vietnam Studies and Observations Group (MACV-SOG or SOG). The purpose of the operation was to create a diversion for an RLA offensive and to exert pressure on PAVN forces. The operation resulted in 54 PAVN and three U.S. killed.

19-28 September

The Republic of Vietnam Navy and Marines mounted an operation against PAVN bases and infiltration routes between the Bassac and Mekong Rivers, 35 miles (56 km) southeast of Phnom Penh, resulting in 233 PAVN killed.

21 September

The Hamlet Evaluation System indicated that 92.8% of the South Vietnamese population was under the control of the South Vietnamese government.

26 September

A Gallup poll found that 55% of Americans supported the McGovern–Hatfield Amendment if there was no declaration of war, while 36% of Americans were opposed.

26 September - 7 January 1971

Operation Counterpunch was an RLA offensive to recapture Moung Soui and pre-empt the PAVN wet season offensive. The operation succeeded in capturing Moung Soui and delayed the PAVN offensive by one month.

27 September

Two U.S. helicopters collided 44 miles (71 km) northeast of Saigon killing all eight crewmen.

== October ==
3 October

A pro-war rally was held in front of the Washington Monument attended by approximately 20,000 people.

4 October

Nixon met with his peace negotiators David Bruce and Philip Habib in Dublin.

Fifteen civilians were killed in VC attacks north of Saigon.

5 October

A PAVN/VC mortar attack on a refugee camp killed 20 civilians and wounded 40. RF/PF forces engaged 100 VC in the same area killing 20. A VC attack on an RF/PF outpost in Phú Yên Province killed 20 ARVN.

6 October

A PAVN/VC mortar attack on a refugee camp near Phú Mỹ killed seven civilians and wounded 52.

7 October

In a nationwide address, Nixon announced a five-point proposal for a truce to halt the war, with all sides to begin a ceasefire and the release of all prisoners of war, in exchange for broader negotiations in the Paris Peace Talks The North Vietnamese and VC delegations to the Paris Peace Talks both denounced Nixon's proposal the next day as "a maneuver to deceive world opinion," but stopped short of rejecting it entirely.

9 October

Flag of the Khmer Republic

The Khmer Republic was proclaimed in Cambodia, four days after the parliament voted unanimously to abolish the 1,168 year old monarchy. Lon Nol was inaugurated as the republic's first president.

11 October

A U.S. helicopter gunship accidentally fired on ARVN troops in the Mekong Delta killing eight.

11-12 October

The U.S. 199th Light Infantry Brigade departed South Vietnam.

13 October

In a report to Nixon, British counterinsurgency expert Robert Grainger Ker Thompson said that the VC infrastructure remained largely intact despite U.S. pacification efforts and that destroying it was essential to end the insurgency.

14 October

Hanoi rejected Nixon's 7 October peace proposal and called for the U.S. to accept the 17 September North Vietnamese/VC proposal.

Nine U.S. and one ARVN soldiers were killed by a VC booby-trap 66 miles (106 km) southeast of Da Nang.

15 October

The 2nd Battalion, 5th Marines handed over An Hoa Combat Base to the ARVN 1st Battalion, 51st Regiment.

18 October

A U.S. plane accidentally bombed an ARVN camp at Thien Ghon killing 18.

19-21 October

The PAVN/VC attacked Thường Ðức Camp but were repelled by ARVN forces with artillery, helicopter gunship and air support. The PAVN/VC lost 163 killed and 20 captured.

19 October - 13 November

The Tchepone Operation was mounted by the RLA to attack PAVN positions at Tchepone and Muang Phine. The operation failed to secure either objective.

20 October

Seven Americans were killed when two helicopters collided northwest of Quảng Ngai.

25 October

Fourteen Americans were killed in mine and booby-trap explosions in Quảng Tín and Quảng Nam Provinces. The ARVN killed 37 PAVN/VC in an operation in Quảng Tín Province.

The Associated Press reported that U.S. special forces had been conducting secret cross-border operation in Laos and that casualties had been included in general casualty figures.

25-9 October

Tropical storms Kate and Joan caused the worst flooding in Quảng Nam Province since 1964, over 200 people, mostly civilians, drowned; over 240,000 temporarily or permanently lost their homes; and 55 percent of the season's rice crop was ruined. Typhoon Kate caused a reduction in Allied air operations.

26 October

The New York Times reported on the declining morale among career U.S. servicemen as a result of the war, anti-war protests, drug and racial problems and the impact of the My Lai massacre.

28 October

UPI journalists Frank Frosch and Kyōichi Sawada were killed by Khmer Rouge on their way to the Kirirom Pass in Cambodia.

29 October

ARVN units engaged a PAVN force near Snuol, Cambodia killing 44 PAVN for the loss of one ARVN. In fighting elsewhere 41 VC were killed.

30 October

The PAVN attacked Landing Zone Oasis occupied by the 6th Battalion, 14th Artillery and elements of B Battery, 4th Battalion, 60th Artillery resulting in three U.S. killed.

MACV reported that deaths from drug abuse among U.S. servicemen were 25 for the year to date compared with 16 for all of 1969.

The South Vietnamese Supreme Court annulled the ten year sentence given to Tran Ngoc Chau on espionage charges.

30 October to 1 November

Heavy flooding in South Vietnam's northern provinces killed 293 people including four U.S. Marines and left more than 200,000 homeless.

31 October

Thiệu declared that the North Vietnamese had no intention of negotiating peace unless it gave them total domination of South Vietnam, that the North regarded the Paris negotiations as a way to achieve victory gradually and that peace could only be achieved through battlefield victory.

== November ==
2 November

U.S. Army Landing Craft Utility LCU-63 capsized in bad weather east of Huế killing all 11 onboard, only two bodies were recovered.

The PAVN/VC fired four rockets into Saigon killing seven civilians and wounding 25.

4 November

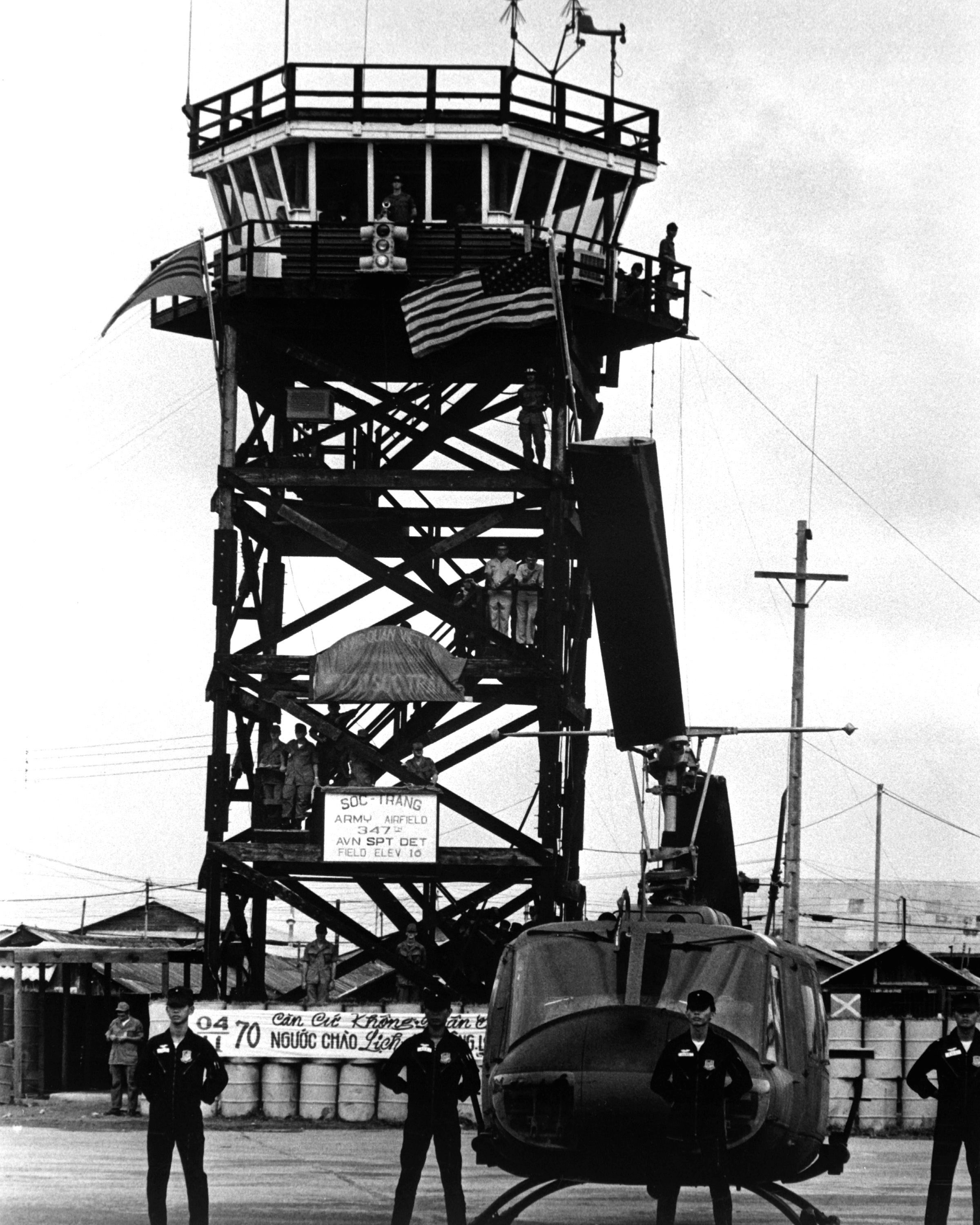
Handover ceremony at Sóc Trăng Airfield.

In a ceremony attended by Abrams and Secretary of the Air Force Robert Seamans Sóc Trăng Airfield was handed over to the RVNAF.

9 November

The U.S. Supreme Court refused to hear a case brought by Massachusetts to challenge the constitutionality of the war.

10 November

CBS broadcast a report showing troops of the 1st Cavalry Division at Firebase Aries smoking marijuana through a shotgun barrel.

13 November

PAVN gunners shot down a U.S. reconnaissance jet 42 miles (68 km) south of Vinh killing both crewmen. Laird said the shootdown violated understandings agreed as part of the November 1968 bombing halt.

Six U.S. soldiers were killed when their truck hit a mine near Quảng Ngai.

15 November

Nine Americans were killed by mines and booby-traps.

16 November

Speaking at West Point at the start of a two week visit to the U.S., Kỳ said that the PAVN would overrun Cambodia in 24 hours if the South Vietnamese withdrew. He warned the Nixon Administration about yielding to antiwar factions and against withdrawing too fast from South Vietnam.

17 November

A PAVN/VC rocket attack on Bien Hoa Air Base killed three Americans and two South Vietnamese and wounded 14 civilians.

The court-martial of William Calley began at Fort Benning.

18 November

Nixon requested $155m in supplemental aid for the Cambodian government.

An HMM-263 CH-46D Sea Knight crashed into terrain in the Quế Sơn District after extracting a Marine patrol killing all 15 onboard. Among those killed was Lieutenant colonel William G. Leftwich Jr. commander of the 1st Reconnaissance Battalion.

19 November

A VC threw a hand grenade into an open-air cinema at Cong Thanh 20 miles (32 km) northeast of Saigon killing nine civilians and wounding 43.

20 November

Following a scandal surrounding the award of the Silver Star to Brigadier General Eugene Forrester, MACV and the Pentagon announced a review of the basis for awarding medals for heroism to officers.

21 November

Operation Ivory Coast was a failed mission to rescue U.S. prisoners of war from the Son Tay prison camp conducted by U.S. Special Forces and other elements of the U.S. military. 25 PAVN guards were killed in the attack for no U.S. losses. One hour after the raid U.S. jets carried out intensive attacks below the 19th parallel which Laird said were in response to the continued North Vietnamese firing on U.S. reconnaissance jets. The North Vietnamese would later claim that 49 civilians were killed and 40 wounded in the attacks.

22 November

U.S. Navy SEALs and ARVN Special Forces rescued 19 ARVN prisoners from a POW camp in the Mekong Delta.

23 November

The North Vietnamese and VC delegations announced they would not attend the next session of the Paris Peace Talks in response to the U.S. attacks against North Vietnam.

24 November

Lard testified before the Senate Foreign Relations Committee in relation to the Son Tay Raid and said that he would recommend a resumption of bombing of North Vietnam if the North continued with its violations of the tacit understanding behind the November 1968 bombing halt.

An RVNAF UH-1 helicopter collided with a U.S. observation plane over the Mekong Delta killing four U.S. and 13 ARVN onboard.

27 November

A USAF C-123K on approach to Nha Trang Air Base in poor visibility crashed into terrain killing six U.S. crew and 73 South Vietnamese.

The PAVN attacked an ARVN task force near Krek, Cambodia losing 48 killed. In fighting in the Rung Sat Special Zone 33 VC were killed.

29 November

A USAF C-123K on approach to Cam Ranh Air Base crashed into terrain killing 32 Americans and 12 South Vietnamese onboard with two Americans surviving.

A USAF F-105G fired on a North Vietnamese SAM site 5 miles (8.0 km) east of the Laos-North Vietnam border in what was later described as a "protective reaction" strike in exercise of what Laird called an "inherent right of self-defense."

== December ==
1-8 December

An ARVN force attacked a PAVN/VC force in the U Minh Forest killing 182 VC for the loss of eight ARVN.

7 December

The U.S. 4th Infantry Division less its 3rd Brigade was withdrawn from South Vietnam.

7-9 December

In Quy Nhon a U.S. soldier accidentally killed a 12 year old South Vietnamese schoolboy while firing to scare away thieves from an Army truck. The killing caused two days of rioting by South Vietnamese with several vehicles burned and Americans attacked before a 24 hour curfew was imposed in the city.

8 December

The U.S. 25th Infantry Division less its 2nd Brigade was withdrawn from South Vietnam.

9 December

200 PAVN attacked an ARVN forces in the Fishhook, Cambodia killing 30 ARVN.

10 December

Nixon warned that if the North Vietnamese increased the level of fighting in South Vietnam as U.S. forces withdrew he would restart bombing North Vietnam. Meanwhile the North Vietnamese called for redoubled efforts to win the war.

12 December

A unit of the 1st Brigade, 5th Infantry Division (Mechanized) on patrol 1 mile (1.6 km) south of the DMZ inadvertently entered an old U.S. minefield and detonated anti-personnel mines killing six U.S.

17 December to 19 January

The ARVN 1st Task Force conducted Operation Hoang Dieu 101, a province-wide campaign of saturation patrolling in the lowlands. In the month-long effort, the South Vietnamese and cooperating U.S. and Korean Marine units claimed to have killed 538 PAVN/VC and to have captured 87 prisoners and 171 weapons. Another 45 PAVN/VC surrendered as Chieu Hoi.

22 December

North Vietnam released their first accounting of American prisoners of war held there, with a partial list of 368 names in "the closest thing yet to an official accounting by Hanoi".

North Vietnamese Defense Minister Võ Nguyên Giáp stated that U.S. reconnaissance aircraft had no right to fly over North Vietnam and would be shot down.

23 December

South Vietnamese forces captured Nguyễn Tài the chief of security for the Saigon-Gia Dinh Party Committee and the highest ranking North Vietnamese cadre captured during the war.

24 December

A U.S. artillery unit accidentally fired on a unit of the 1st Brigade, 101st Airborne Division 11 miles (18 km) south of Huế killing nine.

27 December

Nhân Dân stated that Nixon would "invite upon himself heavier attacks" unless he learnt from Johnson's "failure".

29 December

The Senate approved Nixon's $255m aid package for Cambodia with a revised version of the Cooper–Church Amendment restricting the introduction of ground troops in Laos.

The ARVN repelled an attack by a PAVN force inside Cambodia, killing 74 PAVN for the loss of ten ARVN.

31 December

The VC killed 19 People's Self-Defense Force members in a hamlet in Hậu Nghĩa Province, 90 minutes after the beginning of a VC declared ceasefire.

== Year in numbers ==
Armed Force	Strength	KIA	Reference	Military costs - 1968	Military costs in 2026 US$	Reference
South Vietnam	968,000	23,346
United States	335,800	6,173
South Korea	48,537
Thailand	11,586
Australia	6,763
Philippines	74
New Zealand	441
North Vietnam

== See also ==
List of allied military operations of the Vietnam War (1970)
