= Edward Trobaugh =

United States Army general (1932–2024)

Edward Lee Trobaugh
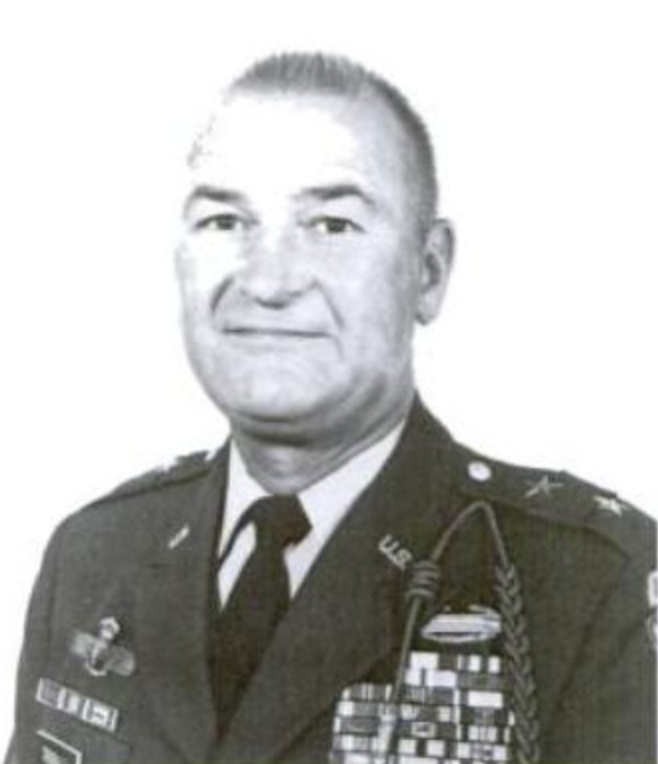
- Pictured as a major general
- Born: November 7, 1932; Logansport, Indiana, U.S.
- Died: May 20, 2024 (aged 91); Washington (state), U.S.
- Military career
- Allegiance: United States of America
- Branch: United States Army
- Service years: 1955–1987
- Rank: Major General
- Commands: 2nd Battalion, 7th Cavalry Regiment; 2nd Brigade, 25th Infantry Division; 82nd Airborne Division; Deputy Commander, Fifth Army
- Conflicts: Vietnam War; US invasion of Grenada
- Awards: Distinguished Service Medal; Silver Star

Edward L. Trobaugh (November 7, 1932 – May 20, 2024) was a United States Army Major General.

== Early life and education ==
Trobaugh graduated from Kokomo High School in 1950.

== Career ==
Trobaugh attended West Point graduating in 1955 and was commissioned a second lieutenant after graduation.

=== 1955-1967 ===
He served with the 3rd Armored Division in West Germany from 1959 to 1961.

=== Vietnam War ===
From 1967 to 1968 Trobaugh served in South Vietnam in the 1st Infantry Division.

In April 1970 Trobaugh was appointed to command the 2nd Battalion, 7th Cavalry Regiment replacing Lt Col. Hannas who had been seriously wounded in a People's Army of Vietnam (PAVN) attack on Firebase Jay on 29 March. 2-7 Cavalry moved to a new base, Firebase Atkinson after the attack on Jay and it too came under attack in the early hours of 16 April 1970 and Trobaugh was slightly wounded while leading the defense of the base.

=== 1970s to 1987 ===
From 1971 to 1973 he attended the United States Army War College. In 1975 he took command of the 2nd Brigade, 25th Infantry Division.

In July 1980 BG Trobaugh became assistant commandant of the United States Army Infantry School.

In 1981 Trobaugh was promoted to major general and from August 1981 he served as Military Assistance Advisory Group, Spain.

Trobaugh served as commander of the 82nd Airborne Division from 24 June 1983 to 19 June 1985 and during this time led the division in the US invasion of Grenada. During the operation the Chairman of the Joint Chiefs of Staff, General John Vessey, reportedly called MG Trobaugh and said “We have two companies of Marines running all over the island and thousands of Army troops doing nothing. What the hell is going on?”

His final assignment was as deputy commander, Fifth Army.

Trobaugh retired from active service in 1987.

== Personal life and death ==
After retiring from the U.S. Army in 1987, he returned to Kokomo, Indiana. He died in Washington (state) on May 20, 2024, at the age of 91. He was buried at the U.S. Military Academy Post Cemetery at West Point.
