= Operation Tailwind =

Part of the Vietnam War (1970)

- Part of the Laotian Civil War and the Vietnam War
- SOG Hatchet force loads up for Operation Tailwind
Date	11–13 September 1970
Location	Southeastern Laos
Result	U.S.-South Vietnamese victory

Belligerents
United States; South Vietnam	North Vietnam; Pathet Lao

Commanders and leaders
CPT Eugene McCarley	Unknown

Strength
Hatchet Force of MACV-SOG: 16 Americans; 110 Montagnards	Unknown

Casualties and losses
3 killed 49 wounded	US Claims: At least 144 NVA killed, wounded another 50. Estimated 288 killed by air strikes.

Operation Tailwind was a covert incursion by a small unit of United States Army and allied Montagnard forces into southeastern Laos during the Vietnam War, conducted from 11 to 14 September 1970. Its purpose was to create a diversion for a Royal Lao Army offensive and to exert pressure on the occupation forces of the People's Army of Vietnam (PAVN). A company-sized element of US Army Special Forces and Montagnard commando (Hatchet Force) of the Military Assistance Command, Vietnam Studies and Observations Group (MACV-SOG or SOG) conducted the operation.

Nearly 30 years later, CNN/Time magazine jointly developed an investigative report that was both broadcast and published in June 1998 about Operation Tailwind. The TV segment was produced by April Oliver, Jack Smith, Pam Hill, and others. It was narrated by Peter Arnett, noted for war reporting, who had received a 1966 Pulitzer Prize for his work from Vietnam and who had worked with CNN for 18 years.

Entitled Valley of Death, the report claimed that US air support had used sarin nerve agent against opponents, and that other war crimes had been committed by US forces during Tailwind. In response the Pentagon conducted an investigation, as did CNN; the news organizations together ultimately retracted the report, and fired the producers responsible. April Oliver and Jack Smith sued CNN in a challenge of their dismissals and reached separate settlements with the network. After being reprimanded by CNN, Arnett resigned from the organization.

Several individuals who were sources for the reports, whose images were shown in the reports, or who were otherwise identified with the reports, brought other legal actions against CNN and Time Warner. A decision by the Ninth Circuit Court of Appeals in one of the cases states that the Tailwind reports did not defame the plaintiff who was a source for the reports. It noted that the plaintiff, in his interviews with CNN, "admitted the truth of each of the three facts he now challenges."

== Operation ==
During late 1970 the overall US-supported military effort in the covert war in the Kingdom of Laos was floundering. Operation Gauntlet, a multi-battalion Royal Lao Army offensive intended to protect Paksong and the strategic Bolovens Plateau, was failing. They appealed to headquarters of Military Assistance Command, Vietnam – Studies and Observations Group (MACV-SOG or SOG) in Saigon requesting aid from the highly classified unit; specifically, they asked for a unit to enter near Chavane and disrupt PAVN defenses. Colonel John Sadler, SOG's commander, agreed to undertake the mission. However, none of his cross-border reconnaissance teams had ever operated so deep in Laos, and the target area was 20 miles (30 km) beyond the unit's authorized area of operations.

The mission was launched by three platoons of Command and Control Central's (Kontum) Hatchet Company B and two United States Air Force Pathfinder Teams. The 110 Montagnards and 16 Americans, under the command of Captain Eugene McCarley, were heli-lifted from a launch site at Dak To to a landing zone (LZ) in a valley 60 miles (97 km) to the west, near Chavane. The distance to the target was so great that the men were lifted by three United States Marine Corps (USMC) Sikorsky CH-53 Sea Stallion helicopters from HMH-463, escorted by 12 USMC and Army Bell AH-1 Cobra gunships.

On the morning of the third day, the Americans overran a PAVN bivouac and killed 54 troops. They questioned why the Vietnamese had not fled the area, but members of the Hatchet Force discovered a bunker buried beneath 12 feet (3.7 m) of earth. Inside they found a huge cache of PAVN maps and documents. They had overrun the PAVN logistical headquarters that controlled all of Laotian Route 165. The forces quickly filled two footlockers with the intelligence haul and the Hatchet Force began to seek a way out. The PAVN were closing in, but McCarley dropped off elements at three separate (and smaller) landing zones, catching the PAVN unprepared.

Casualties incurred during the operation amounted to three Montagnards killed in action and 33 wounded, while all 16 Americans were wounded. Two CH-53s were shot down during the operation. The efforts of SOG medic Sergeant Gary Michael Rose were considered critical to the survival of many of the Hatchet Force. He was recommended for the Medal of Honor for his actions. He instead received the Distinguished Service Cross. This was later upgraded to the Medal of Honor, which President Donald Trump presented to him on October 23, 2017.

== Valley of Death ==
In 1998 Cable News Network (CNN) launched NewsStand CNN & Time, a collaboration with Time magazine on reporting to be both broadcast and published in print form. On 7 June 1998 a report about Operation Tailwind, entitled Valley of Death, was broadcast as the premiere episode of the new program.

The segment analyzed and criticized Operation Tailwind. It alleged that US aircraft, in an unprecedented reversal of policy and breach of international treaties, had used sarin ("GB" in US/NATO nomenclature) against North Vietnamese ground troops who were attacking the landing zones during the extraction of the forces. The Pentagon did not dispute that some chemical agent was used, nor that both North Vietnamese and American soldiers struggled against its effects. However, most witnesses, sworn and unsworn, said that only a potent tear gas (most likely a CN/CS mixture) was used. The Geneva Protocol of 1925 prohibits use of any gas in international conflicts, including tear gas. According to reporting, others insisted it was sarin, or a combination of tear gas and sarin.

A second element of the reporting was an allegation that Operation Tailwind had been devised to eliminate a group of Americans who had defected to the enemy and were holed up in a Laotian village. According to the report, the nerve agent had been sprayed from aircraft twice: once to prep the village and once during extraction of troops. The report claimed that more than 100 Laotian men, women, and children had been killed during the attack on the village and 2 American defectors were also killed.

The broadcast (and the published Time magazine article of June 15) appeared to be reliably sourced. Admiral Thomas Moorer, chairman of the Joint Chiefs of Staff at the time of Tailwind, appeared to say that nerve agents had been used, and not just during this operation. However, Admiral Moorer later told investigators that he "never confirmed anything" to CNN regarding Operation Tailwind, that he had no knowledge of the use of sarin or the targeting of defectors, and he believed that producer April Oliver had asked him "trick" questions. But later again, in sworn deposition testimony taken during the suit of one of the producers, Admiral Moorer reviewed April Oliver's notes of her interviews of him, including his responses to her questions. He did not make any significant objections to their accuracy.

Former SOG Lieutenant Robert Van Buskirk (one of the three platoon leaders) and three of the participating SOG sergeants allegedly gave information that supported the allegations as presented in the televised and published investigative report. Van Buskirk said that the Montagnard Hatchet Force was exposed on the landing zone ("LZ") when the teargas agent was deployed to drive the enemy back. He also said that he saw his men (who were not equipped with gas masks) convulsing when the wind blew the agent back upon the LZ.

The CNN/Time reports suggested that war crimes had been committed. The Pentagon launched its own investigation. Another piece of evidence for the usage of sarin came from the fact that at least one American involved in the operation suffered from a degenerative neurological disorder caused by exposure to nerve gas.

=== Aftermath ===
CNN and Time magazine undertook an internal investigation. New York attorney Floyd Abrams, a constitutional lawyer, was hired to conduct the investigation for them. They jointly concluded that the journalism of the report was "flawed," and the report should be publicly retracted, with apologies made to persons and institutions cited in it. The two key CNN producers of the report, April Oliver and Jack Smith, were fired outright when they refused to resign. Senior producer Pam Hill of CNN resigned. Reporter Peter Arnett was reprimanded and soon resigned, going to work for HDNet and then NBC.

Abrams later said that he had urged CNN/Time Warner to retract the report, but to acknowledge that it may have had truth to it. He said, retraction "doesn't necessarily mean that the story isn't true. … Who knows? Someday we might find other information. And, you know, maybe someday I'll be back here again, having done another report saying that, 'You know what? It was all true.'"

In early July 1998, Tom Johnson, CNN News Group Chairman, President and CEO, issued a statement about the findings of the internal investigation. He pledged acceptance of the findings and reiterated that the allegations in Valley of Death and related reports "cannot be supported." He said there was insufficient evidence that sarin or any other deadly gas was used, nor could CNN confirm that American deserters were targeted, or whether they were at the camp in Laos.

As a supplement to CNN's retraction, on July 2 and July 5, 1998, the company aired retraction broadcasts that sought to portray some of the sources for the Tailwind reports as unreliable.

Oliver and Smith were chastised but unrepentant. They put together a 77-page document supporting their side of the story; it included testimony from military personnel apparently confirming the use of sarin. Active and retired military personnel consulted by the media, including CNN's own military analyst, USAF Major General Perry Smith (ret), noted that a particularly strong, non-lethal formulation of "CS" teargas was used during Tailwind. But they said that it should not be confused with sarin, which is categorized as a weapon of mass destruction by the United Nations. Use of tear gas in warfare is prohibited by the Geneva Protocol of 1925.

Several individuals who were sources for the reports, whose images were shown in the reports, or who were otherwise identified with the reports, brought other legal actions against CNN and Time Warner. These actions were combined by the Judicial Panel for Multidistrict Litigation and were assigned to the United States District Court in the Northern District of California. They became collectively known as the "Operation Tailwind" litigation.

CNN and Time Warner defended its reports from claims of defamation, and most of these actions were dismissed by the court. In none of these cases did the court find that the original Tailwind reports had defamed anyone.

A decision by the Ninth Circuit Court of Appeals in one of the cases states that the Tailwind reports did not defame the plaintiff who was a source for the reports. It noted that the plaintiff, in his interviews with CNN, "admitted the truth of each of the three facts he now challenges." The Ninth Circuit said that CNN may have subsequently defamed this source in its retraction broadcast's statement seeking to portray the source as "unreliable". The court concluded that the question of whether the source was defamed by CNN in that retraction broadcast "merits further development", and the appeals court remanded "this issue to the district court for further proceedings."

=== In popular culture ===
The HBO series The Newsroom featured a major storyline in its second season that explored the fictional ACN's coverage of "Operation Genoa". This was loosely based on CNN's coverage of Tailwind.
