= Robert L. Howard =

American Army Special Forces officer

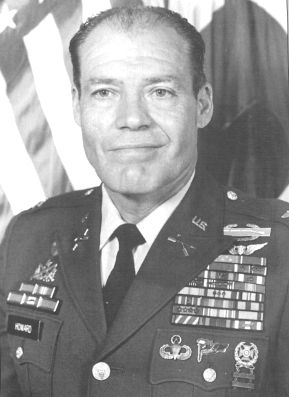
- Colonel Robert L. Howard
- Born: July 11, 1939; Opelika, Alabama, U.S.
- Died: December 23, 2009 (aged 70); Waco, Texas, U.S.
- Burial place: Arlington National Cemetery Section 7A Grave 138
- Military career
- Allegiance: United States
- Branch: United States Army
- Service years: 1956–1992
- Rank: Colonel
- Units: 101st Airborne Division; 5th Special Forces Group; MACV-SOG; Special Operations Command Korea
- Conflicts: Vietnam War
- Awards: Medal of Honor; Distinguished Service Cross; Silver Star; Defense Superior Service Medal; Legion of Merit (4); Bronze Star Medal (4); Purple Heart (8)
- Other work: Department of Veterans Affairs

Robert Lewis Howard (July 11, 1939 – December 23, 2009) was a United States Army Special Forces officer and recipient of the Medal of Honor for his actions in the Vietnam War. He was wounded 14 times over 54 months of combat, was awarded the Medal of Honor, eight Purple Hearts, Distinguished Service Cross, (Note: He initially was awarded a second Distinguished Service Cross, but this was later rescinded and upgraded to the Medal of Honor) a Silver Star, and four Bronze Stars.

Howard was nominated for the Medal of Honor three times over a 13-month period but received lesser medals for the first two nominations, which were for actions performed in Cambodia where the U.S. was fighting covertly. He was awarded the Medal of Honor for his actions on December 30, 1968, his third nomination. He retired from the United States Army after 36 years of service as a full colonel. He was one of the most decorated soldiers in the Vietnam War and was "said to be the most decorated service member in the history of the United States".

Howard died as a result of pancreatic cancer, and was buried at Arlington National Cemetery on February 22, 2010.

== Military career ==
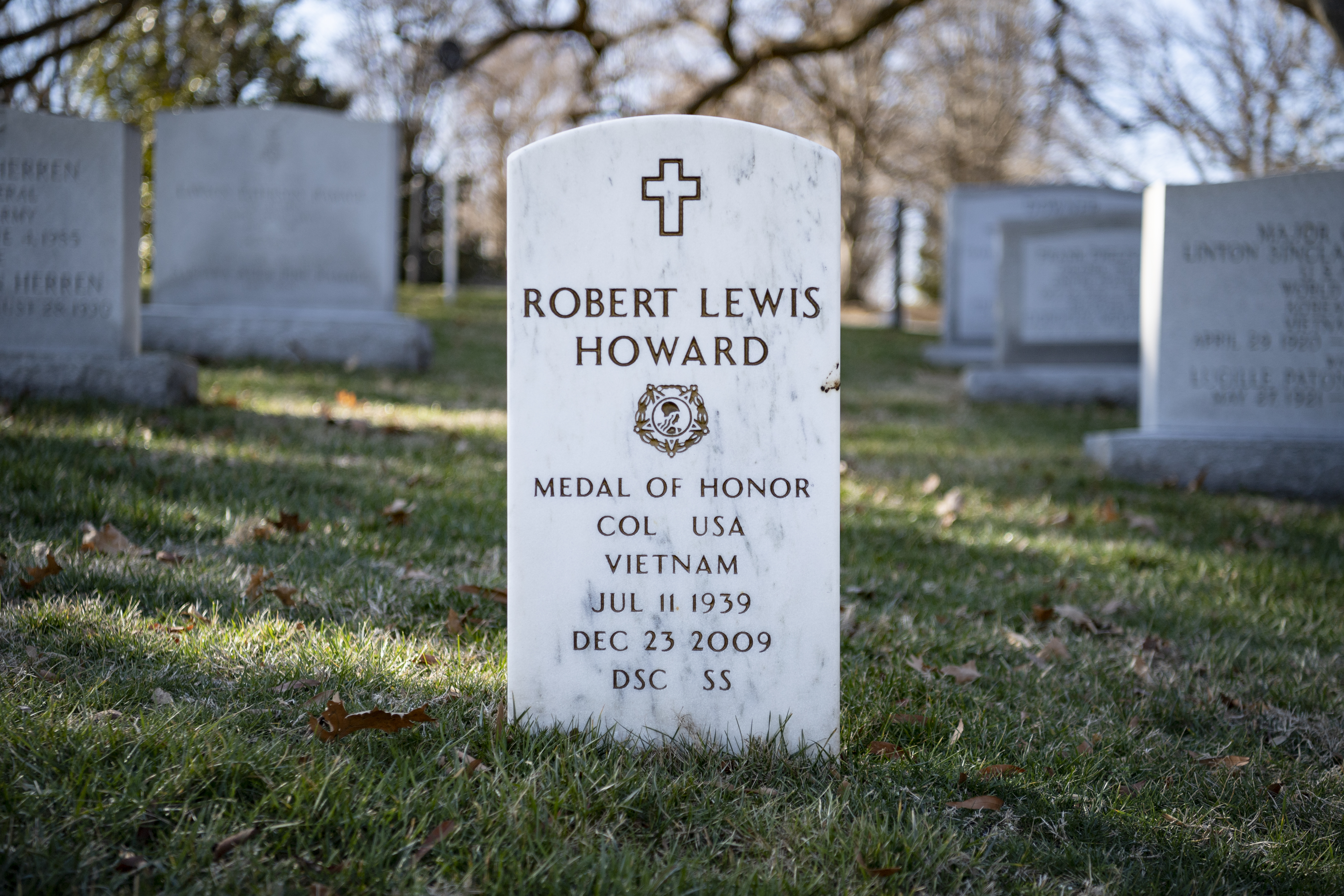
Grave at Arlington National Cemetery

Howard enlisted in the United States Army in 1956 at Montgomery, Alabama and retired as colonel, Army Special Forces, in 1992.

Howard's service in Vietnam included assignments with 1-327th Airborne Infantry, 1st Brigade, 101st Airborne Division, 5th Special Forces Group and MACV-SOG

As a Staff Sergeant of the highly classified Military Assistance Command, Vietnam – Studies and Observations Group (MACV-SOG), Howard was recommended for the Medal of Honor on three occasions for three individual actions during thirteen months spanning 1967–1968. The first two nominations were downgraded to a Silver Star and the Distinguished Service Cross due to the covert and top secret nature of the operations in which Howard participated.

As a Sergeant First Class of the SOG, he risked his life during a rescue mission in Cambodia on December 30, 1968, while second in command of a platoon-sized Hatchet Force that was searching for missing American soldier Robert Scherdin for which he was awarded the Medal of Honor. He learned of the award over a two-way radio while under enemy fire, immediately after being wounded, resulting in one of his eight Purple Hearts.

Howard was wounded 14 times during a 54-month period in the Vietnam War. For his distinguished service, Howard received a direct appointment from Master Sergeant to First Lieutenant in December 1969.

Howard graduated from Ranger School class 7–73 in May 1973 and served with the 2nd Ranger Battalion at Fort Lewis, Washington as company commander. From 1977 to 1978 he served as Mountain Ranger Training instructor.

Howard later served as officer-in-charge of Special Forces training at Camp Mackall, near Ft. Bragg, N.C., and later, commanding the Mountain Ranger Training Camp at Dahlonega, Georgia

Howard graduated from the National War College, Class 1987–1988.

He received two master's degrees during his Army career which spanned 1956 to 1992. Howard retired as a colonel in 1992.

He was one of the most decorated soldiers in the Vietnam War. NBC News said that Howard may have been the most highly decorated American soldier of the modern era, while KWTX-TV states that he was "said to be the most decorated service member in the history of the United States". John Plaster in his 1998 book SOG: The Secret Wars of America's Commandos in Vietnam states that Howard "remains to this day the most highly decorated American soldier."

== Later life ==
His residence was in Texas and he spent much of his free time working with veterans until the time of his death. He also took periodic trips to Iraq to visit active duty troops.

Howard died of pancreatic cancer at a hospital in Waco, Texas, on December 23, 2009. He was survived by four children and five grandchildren. His funeral was in Arlington National Cemetery on February 22, 2010.

== Legacy ==
In 2014, Howard was announced as the recipient of United States Special Operations Command's Bull Simons award for his "lifetime achievements in Special Operations".

In April 2017 a building at the Rowe Training Facility on Camp Mackall was named Howard Hall in his honor. The Alabama Department of Veterans Affairs named its fourth State Veterans Home, constructed in 2012 in Pell City, Alabama, in Howard's honor.

== Medal of Honor citation ==
The President of the United States in the name of The Congress takes pride in presenting the MEDAL OF HONOR to

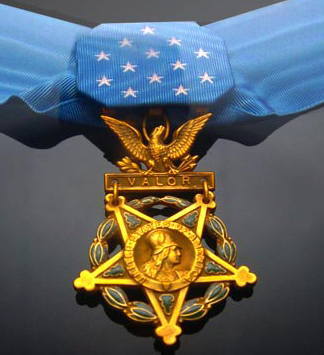

FIRST LIEUTENANT
ROBERT L. HOWARD
UNITED STATES ARMY

for service as set forth in the following CITATION:

For conspicuous gallantry and intrepidity in action at the risk of his life above and beyond the call of duty. 1st Lt. Howard (then SFC .), distinguished himself while serving as platoon sergeant of an American-Vietnamese platoon which was on a mission to rescue a missing American soldier in enemy controlled territory in the Republic of Vietnam. The platoon had left its helicopter landing zone and was moving out on its mission when it was attacked by an estimated 2-company force. During the initial engagement, 1st Lt. Howard was wounded and his weapon destroyed by a grenade explosion. 1st Lt. Howard saw his platoon leader had been wounded seriously and was exposed to fire. Although unable to walk, and weaponless, 1st Lt. Howard unhesitatingly crawled through a hail of fire to retrieve his wounded leader. As 1st Lt. Howard was administering first aid and removing the officer's equipment, an enemy bullet struck 1 of the ammunition pouches on the lieutenant's belt, detonating several magazines of ammunition. 1st Lt. Howard momentarily sought cover and then realizing that he must rejoin the platoon, which had been disorganized by the enemy attack, he again began dragging the seriously wounded officer toward the platoon area. Through his outstanding example of indomitable courage and bravery, 1st Lt. Howard was able to rally the platoon into an organized defense force. With complete disregard for his safety, 1st Lt. Howard crawled from position to position, administering first aid to the wounded, giving encouragement to the defenders and directing their fire on the encircling enemy. For 3 1/2 hours 1st Lt. Howard's small force and supporting aircraft successfully repulsed enemy attacks and finally were in sufficient control to permit the landing of rescue helicopters. 1st Lt. Howard personally supervised the loading of his men and did not leave the bullet-swept landing zone until all were aboard safely. 1st Lt. Howard's gallantry in action, his complete devotion to the welfare of his men at the risk of his life were in keeping with the highest traditions of the military service and reflect great credit on himself, his unit, and the U.S. Army.

General Orders: Department of the Army, General Orders No. 16 (March 24, 1971)

Action Date: December 30, 1968

Service: Army

Regiment: 5th Special Forces Group (Airborne)

Division: 1st Special Forces

== Distinguished Service Cross citation ==

Robert L. Howard

Service: Army
Division: 1st Special Forces
GENERAL ORDERS:
General Orders: Headquarters, U.S. Army, Vietnam, General Orders No. 2018 (May 2, 1968)

Citation:

The President of the United States of America, authorized by Act of Congress, July 9, 1918 (amended by act of July 25, 1963), takes pleasure in presenting the Distinguished Service Cross to Sergeant First Class Robert Lewis Howard (ASN: RA-14628152), United States Army, for extraordinary heroism in connection with military operations involving conflict with an armed hostile force in the Republic of Vietnam, while serving with Command and Control (Central), 5th Special Forces Group (Airborne), 1st Special Forces. Sergeant First Class Howard distinguished himself by exceptionally valorous actions on 21 November 1967, as Special Forces Advisor to a joint American and Vietnamese reconnaissance patrol conducting a search mission near the Laotian border. His patrol discovered a huge rice and ammunition cache surrounded by an enemy bunker complex. Sergeant Howard led a small team to provide security while the remainder of the unit began to destroy the stored supplies. His team encountered four North Vietnamese Army soldiers, and Sergeant Howard killed them with a fierce burst of rifle fire. He and his men were immediately pinned down by a murderous curtain of fire which erupted from a nearby enemy machine gun position. With complete disregard for his safety, Sergeant Howard crawled toward the emplacement and killed a North Vietnamese sniper who was firing at him as he maneuvered. He then charged the bunker, eliminating its occupants with rifle fire. A second machine gun position unleashed a savage barrage. Sergeant Howard moved his troops to a covered location and directed an air strike against the fortified bunker. While assessing the bomb damage, Sergeant Howard was fired upon by North Vietnamese soldiers in the bunker who had survived the blasts. Pinned down directly outside the strongpoint with a blazing machine gun barrel only six inches above his head, he threw a hand grenade into the aperture of the emplacement, killing the gunners and temporarily silencing the weapon. He then dashed to his team's location and secured a light anti-tank weapon. As the enemy machine gun resumed firing, Sergeant Howard stood up amid a withering hail of bullets, fired his weapon, and completely demolished the position. His fearless and determined actions in close combat enabled the remainder of the patrol to destroy the enemy cache. Sergeant First Class Howard's extraordinary heroism and devotion to duty were in keeping with the highest traditions of the military service and reflect great credit upon himself, his unit, and the United States Army.

Action Date: 21-Nov-67

Service: Army

Rank: Sergeant First Class

Company: Command and Control (Central)

Regiment: 5th Special Forces Group (Airborne)

Division: 1st Special Forces

== Silver Star citation ==
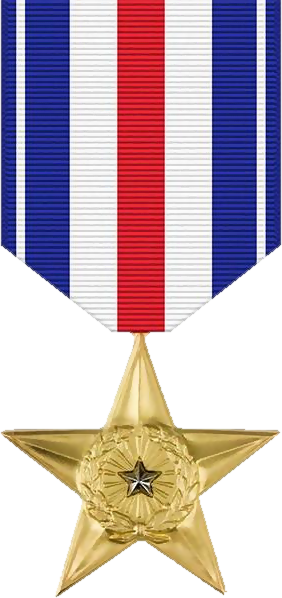

Robert L. Howard

Service: Army
Regiment: 5th Special Forces Group (Airborne)
Division: 1st Special Forces
GENERAL ORDERS:
Headquarters, U.S. Army, Vietnam, General Orders No. 371 (February 3, 1969)

Citation:

The President of the United States of America, authorized by Act of Congress, July 9, 1918, takes pleasure in presenting the Silver Star to Sergeant First Class Robert Lewis Howard (ASN: RA-14628152), United States Army, for gallantry in action while engaged in military operations involving conflict with an armed hostile force in the Republic of Vietnam, while serving with Headquarters and Headquarters Company, 5th Special Forces Group (Airborne), 1st Special Forces. Sergeant First Class Howard distinguished himself by exceptionally valorous actions from 12 to 20 November 1968, during an operation deep within enemy-held territory. As his platoon was being inserted into the area, it came under heavy fire from all directions. Sergeant Howard leaped from his helicopter before it touched down and began to return fire, providing protection for his men while they dismounted and moved safely off the landing zone. Seeing two enemy soldiers in a wood line, he charged their position and killed them both. When the unit was attacked by a company-size force on the night of 16 November, he went to each platoon member, encouraging them and directing their fire while completely exposing himself to the communist barrage. Two days later while Sergeant Howard was leading the point element, the platoon was ambushed by an estimated two North Vietnamese Army companies. He skillfully maneuvered his men so that the enemy was caught in a deadly crossfire and the ambush was broken. The following day, Sergeant Howard had again taken the point element when he observed an estimated battalion-size ambush. Although wounded in the initial exchange of fire, he exposed himself to the aggressors to place effective fire on them and enable his platoon to take cover. Moving from position to position, he administered first aid to the wounded and set up a landing zone so that they could be evacuated. As the first ambulance helicopter came in, it was struck by hostile machine gun fire and burst into flames. Sergeant Howard, although wounded a second time, ran one hundred and fifty meters to where the ship had crashed and rescued a trapped pilot from the blazing wreckage. Once the entire crew was free from the aircraft, he led them back to the platoon while providing covering fire. Three hours later another helicopter succeeded in landing and the casualties were evacuated, but Sergeant Howard refused to leave. The next morning, he saw three North Vietnamese soldiers maneuvering towards his element and immediately opened fire, killing them.

== Awards and decorations ==
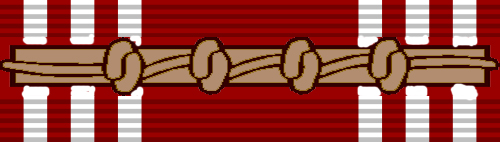
U.S. Awards and Decorations Personal awards Medal of Honor Distinguished Service Cross Silver Star Defense Superior Service Medal Legion of Merit with 3 oak leaf clusters Bronze Star with "V" device & 3 oak leaf clusters Purple Heart with 7 oak leaf clusters Meritorious Service Medal with 2 oak leaf clusters Air Medal with "V" device & award numerals 3 Joint Service Commendation Army Commendation Medal with "V" device & 6 oak leaf clusters Joint Service Achievement Medal Army Achievement Medal	U.S. Awards and Decorations Unit awards Presidential Unit Citation with oak leaf cluster Navy Unit Commendation Meritorious Unit Commendation Service awards Good Conduct Medal with 4 Good Conduct Loops Campaign & Service awards National Defense Service Medal with one bronze service star Armed Forces Expeditionary Medal with 3 service stars Vietnam Service Medal with 3 service stars Service & Training awards Armed Forces Reserve Medal NCO Professional Development with bronze award numeral 2 Army Service Ribbon Army Overseas Service Ribbon

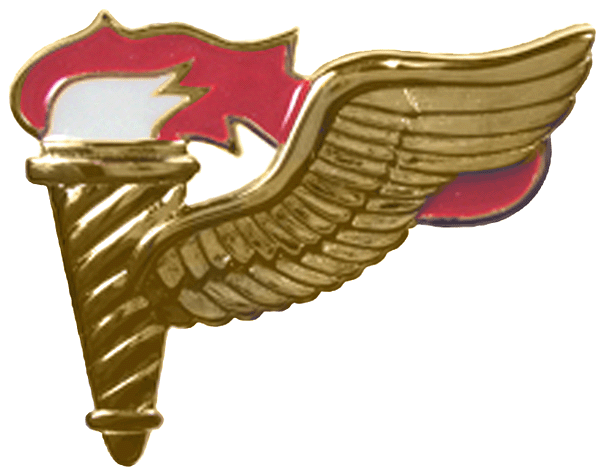
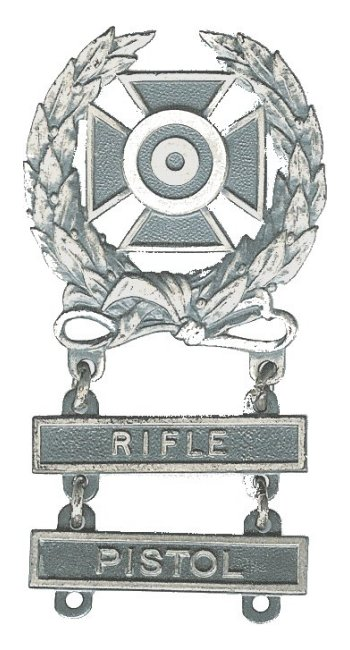
U.S. Awards and Decorations Badges and tabs Special Forces Tab Ranger Tab Combat Infantryman Badge Expert Infantryman Badge Basic Aircrew Badge Master Parachutist Badge Air Assault Badge Pathfinder Badge Expert Marksmanship Badge w/ 2 weapon bars

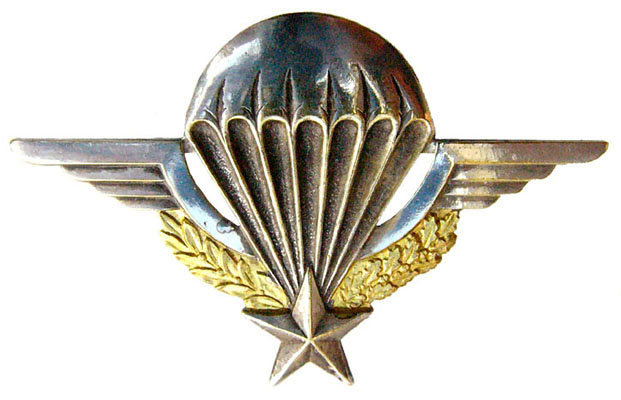
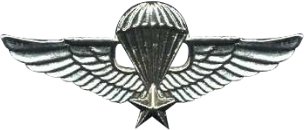
Foreign Awards and Decorations Individual & Unit awards Republic of Korea Order of National Security Merit (Sam-Il Medal) Vietnamese Cross of Gallantry with Gold Star (Corps), Silver Star (Division) and 2 Bronze Stars (Regiment/Brigade) Republic of Vietnam Wound Medal Republic of Vietnam Armed Forces Honor Medal, 1st Class Republic of Vietnam Staff Service Medal, 2nd Class Republic of Vietnam Civil Actions Medal, 1st Class Republic of Vietnam Gallantry Cross Unit Citation Republic of Vietnam Civil Actions Medal Unit Citation Republic of Vietnam Campaign Medal Badges French Parachutist Badge Republic of Vietnam Master Parachute Badge Republic of Vietnam Ranger Badge Thai Master Parachute Wings Korean Master Parachute Badge Thai Balloonist Badge

== See also ==
- List of Medal of Honor recipients for the Vietnam War
- List of French Paratrooper Units
