= Ban Karai Pass =

Mountain pass in Vietnam

- Location within Vietnam
- Elevation: 418 metres (1,371 ft)

Location
- Location: Vietnam–Laos border
- Range: Annamite Range
- Coordinates: 17°19′48″N 106°12′7.2″E

The Ban Karai Pass (Đèo Ban Karai, Quảng Bình) is a mountain pass in the Annamite Range between northern Vietnam and Laos, located approximately 60 km southwest of Đồng Hới and 115 km northwest of Quảng Trị, Vietnam. The pass is 418 m above sea level and connects National Road 565 (formerly Route 137) in Vietnam to Route 912 in Khammouane Province in Laos.

The pass, together with the Mụ Giạ Pass was one of the principal entry points into the Ho Chi Minh trail through Laos. Southwest of the pass in Laos was an area nicknamed "the Chokes" where several highways from the Mụ Giạ and Ban Karai passes converged.

The CIA stationed roadwatch teams near the pass to monitor Vietnamese supply activities and it became one of the prime targets of Operation Commando Hunt. Despite frequent bombing, the United States Air Force and United States Navy were never able to put the pass out of operation for any sustained period of time.

From 19 April to 24 June 1968 the USAF conducted Operation Turnpike, an intensive air interdiction campaign against the Mụ Giạ and Ban Karai Passes, that included the use of B-52 bombers. In March 1969 USAF UC-123s sprayed defoliants over a four square mile area on an approach road to the pass.

During 1968 the area around the pass was defended by numerous machine-guns and smaller calibre (23mm and 37mm) anti-aircraft artillery (AAA). In December 1970 the North Vietnamese stationed SA-2 missiles on the North Vietnamese side of the Mụ Giạ and Ban Karai Passes. By 1971 given the buildup of large calibre (57mm, 85mm and 100mm) radar-guided AAA and the presence of SA-2s, USAF AC-119 gunships and B-52s no longer operated near the pass.

During 1970 the North Vietnamese built a petroleum-oil-lubricants pipeline through the pass.
