= 1970 South Vietnamese Senate election =

Senate elections were held in South Vietnam on 30 August 1970. The election was contested by a total of 16 lists, of which the three highest polling would be elected and receive ten seats each. Each voter had three votes, with the winning list receiving 1,149,597 votes (12%), whilst the third-placed list won 882,274 votes (9%). Voter turnout was reported to be 65%.

== Results ==
| Party | Votes | % | Seats |
|---|---|---|---|
| The People | 1,149,597 | 11.71 | 10 |
| The Sun | 1,106,288 | 11.27 | 10 |
| Public Good and Social Justice | 882,274 | 8.99 | 10 |
| Just Peace | 800,453 | 8.15 | 0 |
| Progress | 654,833 | 6.67 | 0 |
| Sheaf of Rice | 628,992 | 6.41 | 0 |
| Three Lotus Blossoms | 611,351 | 6.23 | 0 |
| Mother and Child | 591,258 | 6.02 | 0 |
| People and Peace | 533,692 | 5.44 | 0 |
| Democratic Buddhist Alliance | 492,131 | 5.01 | 0 |
| Revolution | 453,168 | 4.62 | 0 |
| Greater Solidarity | 430,465 | 4.38 | 0 |
| South North Center | 420,688 | 4.28 | 0 |
| Support of the Government | 399,767 | 4.07 | 0 |
| The People First | 342,416 | 3.49 | 0 |
| Fish and Water | 320,365 | 3.26 | 0 |
| Total | 9,817,738 | 100.00 | 30 |
| Total votes | 4,299,516 | – | |
| Registered voters/turnout | 6,578,082 | 65.36 | |
Source: Public Administration Bulletin Vietnam
