= Battle of Kompong Speu =

Battle

- Part of Vietnam War And Cambodian Civil War
- Map showing the areas under Communist control
Date	12–16 June 1970
Location	Chbar Mon, Cambodia 11.26°N 104.32°E
Result	ARVN and Cambodian victory

Belligerents
North Vietnam	South Vietnam; State of Cambodia

Commanders and leaders
Unknown	(Cambodia) Chantaraingsey

Strength
(Vietnam) 1,400	(South Vietnam) 4,000 (Cambodia) 2,000

Casualties and losses
(Vietnam) 183 killed(see body count claims)	(South Vietnam) 28 killed

The Battle of Kompong Speu began on June 12, 1970, when the combined forces of the Army of the Republic of Vietnam (ARVN) and the Khmer National Armed Forces (FANK) fought to recapture the provincial capital of Kampong Speu. The town was captured by People's Army of Vietnam forces on 13 June but was retaken by ARVN/FANK forces on 16 June.
