= Firebase Atkinson =

Former U.S. Army firebase

Site information
- Type: Army

Location
- Location within Vietnam
- Coordinates: 11.555°N 105.921°E

Site history
- Built: 1970
- In use: 1970
- Battles/wars: Vietnam War; Cambodian Incursion

Garrison information
- Occupants: 7th Cavalry Regiment

Firebase Atkinson is a former U.S. Army firebase northwest of Tây Ninh in southwest Vietnam.

== History ==
The firebase was first established in March 1970 by the 7th Cavalry Regiment, 7 km northwest of Đồng Xoài.

On 16 April 1970 the base was occupied by B Company, 2nd Battalion, 7th Cavalry and B Battery, 2nd Battalion, 19th Artillery. At approximately midnight the People's Army of Vietnam (PAVN) 95C Regiment hit the base with mortar, rocket and recoilless rifle fire and then attacked the base perimeter. The PAVN attacks were beaten back by 02:00. U.S. losses were seven killed, while approximately 66 PAVN dead were found around the base perimeter.

== Current use ==
The base has reverted to farmland.
