= Operation Pennsylvania Square =

Part of the Vietnam War (1970–1971)

- Part of the Vietnam War
Date	29 June 1970 – 1 March 1971
Location	Quảng Tín Province (now Quảng Nam Province), South Vietnam
Result	US operational success

Belligerents
United States	North Vietnam

Units involved
198th Light Infantry Brigade	2nd Division

Casualties and losses
20 killed	264 killed 13 captured

Operation Pennsylvania Square was a security operation during the Vietnam War conducted by the 198th Light Infantry Brigade, 23rd Infantry Division in Quảng Tín Province from 29 June 1970 to 1 March 1971.

== Background ==
The operation began on 29 June 1970 in the open terrain in the northeastern portion of the Division’s area of operations in terrain ideally for the employment of armor. The 1st Squadron, 1st Cavalry Regiment with F Troop, 17th Cavalry Regiment attached was given responsibility for the operation.

== Operation ==
=== 1970 ===
On 3 November a mechanical ambush was detonated resulting in 1 VC killed. On 8 November an ACAV detonated a mine destroying the vehicle. On 10 November another ACAV detonated a mine destroying the vehicle. On 12 November an RPG hit an M113 resulting in moderate damage. On 13 November an M551 Sheridan detonated a mine destroying the vehicle. On 20 November an M113 detonated a mine destroying the vehicle. During the period from 20-29 November the Squadron reported 8 VC killed and 6 weapons captured. On 30 November an ACAV detonated a mine destroying the vehicle.

On 7 December an ACAV from Troop C, 1/1st Cavalry detonated an anti-tank mine resulting in 2 US killed. On 11 December in two separate incidents, Troop C, 1/1st Cavalry detonated two anti-tank mines resulting in moderate damage to an M551.

=== 1971 ===
On 8 January Troop C, 1/1st Cavalry made three separate contacts resulting in 4 VC killed, 1 weapon capture and 2 suspects detained and Troop E killed 2 VC and captured 1 weapon. On 22 January Troop B had a mechanical ambush detonate resulted in 1 VC killed. On 25 January Troop F, 17th Cavalry reported a mechanical ambush had been detonated with 2 PAVN killed. On 26 January the 196th Light Infantry Brigade assumed responsibility the operation. On 1 February Troop D, 1/1st Cavalry engaged 1 VC killing him and capturing 4 weapons. Total results for the period 1 through 14 February were 5 PAVN/VC killed. On 15 February Troop F, 17th Cavalry engaged and killed 6 VC and captured 3 weapons. On 22 February Troop F, 17th Cavalry engaged and destroyed a bunker killing 2 PAVN and capturing 4 weapons. On 28 February Troop F, 17th Cavalry engaged and killed 6 VC and captured 3 weapons.

== Aftermath ==
The operation was terminated on 1 March 1971. US losses were 20 killed, while PAVN/VC losses were 264 killed and 13 captured.
