= Firebase Jay =

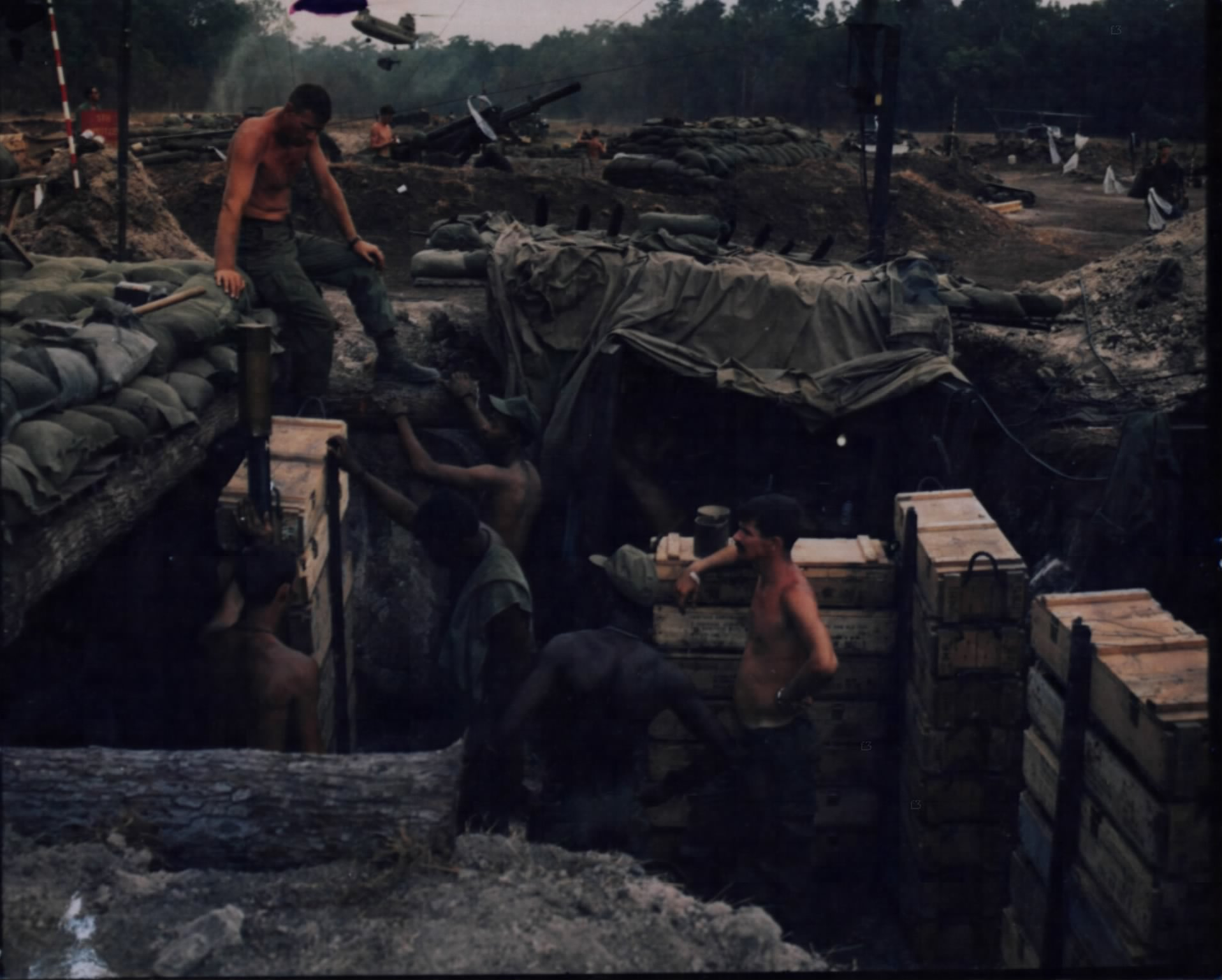
- Men of the 2nd Battalion, 8th Regiment, 1st Cavalry Division improve bunkers at Jay, 21 March 1970

Site information
- Type: Army

Location
- Coordinates: 11.532°N 105.944°E

Site history
- Built: 1970
- In use: 1970
- Battles/wars: Vietnam War; Cambodian Incursion

Garrison information
- Occupants: 7th Cavalry Regiment

Firebase Jay is a former U.S. Army firebase northwest of Tây Ninh in southwest Vietnam.

== History ==
The firebase was first established in March 1970 by the 7th Cavalry Regiment, 45 km northwest of Núi Bà Đen and approximately 5 km from the Cambodian border.

On 29 March 1970 the base was occupied by Companies A and E, 2nd Battalion, 7th Cavalry, B Battery, 2nd Battalion, 12th Artillery and B Battery, 2nd Battalion, 19th Artillery. At approximately 04:15 the People's Army of Vietnam (PAVN) 272nd Regiment hit the base with mortar, rocket and recoilless rifle fire hitting the command post and knocking out communications. The battalion commander Lt Col Hannas was seriously injured, losing both legs in the initial bombardment. The PAVN then launched infantry attacks on the base perimeter but were beaten back by dawn. U.S. losses were 13 killed, while 74 PAVN dead were found in and around the base.

== Current use ==
The base has reverted to farmland.
