= Running dog =

Pejorative term

- Chinese: 走狗
- Literal meaning: Running dog
Transcriptions
Standard Mandarin
- Hanyu Pinyin: Zǒugǒu
- Wade–Giles: Tsou-gou

Running dog is a pejorative term for an unprincipled person who helps or flatters those who are more powerful and often evil. It is a calque of the Chinese pejorative 走狗 (pinyin: zǒugǒu), meaning a yes-man or lackey, and is derived from the tendency of dogs to follow after humans in hopes of receiving food scraps. Historian Yuan-tsung Chen notes that "In the West, a dog is a man's best friend; but in China, dogs are abject creatures. In Chinese, no idiomatic expression [is] more demeaning than the term 'running dogs.'"

The term "imperialist running dog" (帝国主义的走狗; dìguó zhǔyì de zǒugǒu) was used by Mao Zedong to refer to allies of counterrevolutionary imperialist forces. Historian Chang-tai Hung suggests the term was used to invoke negative mental imagery; "The image of ... a running dog parallels that of the United States as a wolf. Both bestial representations provide convenient and familiar symbols that political artists can target, but they also validate the use of violence since the annihilation of beasts is justified. ... [The representations of enemies as beasts such as running dogs or rats] call to mind repulsive creatures that inflict damage on the nation."

In 1950, an article in The China Weekly Review gave the definition "A running-dog is a lackey, one who aids and accompanies in the hope of being treated kindly and perhaps being allowed to share in the spoils."

In 1953, a Saturday Evening Post article offered a definition for tso kou ("running dog") and kou t'ui tee ("dog's hips"), saying "A 'running dog' was a person who follows obediently after the person whose dog he is, a fellow traveler; a 'dog's hips' was simply an enthusiastic running dog, who exercises his hips while running errands for his master."

Historian James Reeve Pusey captures some of the power of the idiom when telling of Lu Xun's reaction to seeing people in power mistreat others with the idiom "the weak are the meat of the strong". Lu's anger spilt over to the point of having a reaction even against those calling for resistance without vengeance "For the loudest of such people, he thought, were running dogs of the people-eaters, fed at least on scraps of human flesh."

The phrase running dog is attested to in Han Dynasty historian Sima Qian's Records of the Grand Historian, in which the idiom appears: 狡兔死, 走狗烹 (when the rabbit of the hunt is captured, the running dog is boiled), referring to ones in power discarding their lackeys once their goals are achieved. In the 20th century, this was often used by communists to refer to client states of the United States and other capitalist powers.

"Vanguards of young Moslems were ... urging the overthrow of the 'Kuomintang running-dog'".

In 2021 China's consul general to Rio de Janeiro, Li Yang, insulted Canadian Prime Minister Justin Trudeau in a tweet: "Boy, your greatest achievement is to have ruined the friendly relations between China and Canada, and have turned Canada into a running dog of the U.S."

The term is used as the name of a mission referencing its implied meaning in the 2004 action-adventure video game Grand Theft Auto: San Andreas.
