= Hatchet Force =

- The patch of Company C, Command & Control Central, MACV-SOG
- Active: 1966 – October 1972, January 1973
- Country: United States
- Allegiance: United States; South Vietnam
- Branch: MACV-SOG
- Type: Special forces
- Role: Ho Chi Minh trail operations
- Size: 16-man teams, or larger
- Part of: United States Army Special Forces
- Nickname: "Hatchet Force"
- Engagements: Vietnam War

A Hatchet Force or Hatchet Team was a special operations team of American and South Vietnamese members of MACV-SOG during the Vietnam War, who operated in small covert operations along the Ho Chi Minh trail from 1966. The units specialized in search and destroy missions and in locating missing American servicemen in Laos, Cambodia and North Vietnam.

== Organization ==
Hatchet Force teams were organized under three field commands: Command and Control North (CCN), Command and Control Center (CCC) and Command and Control South (CCS). Operating in small groups, usually three American Special Forces soldiers – a team leader, a radioman and a medic – and 20–40 indigenous soldiers, the teams' purpose was to "probe the border areas looking for a fight". Hatchet Force teams remained in operation until each field command was deactivated; for CCN this was on 16 October 1972, CCC on 18 October 1972, and CCS in January 1973.

== Operations ==
=== Khe Sanh 1967–1968 ===
During the siege of Khe Sanh, the United States Marine Corps airfield, Hatchet Forces operated out of Firebase-3. While the Hatchet team consisted of six American special forces and 32 indigenous soldiers, the firebase held 131 Americans and 457 Special Commando Units of indigenous soldiers. The Hatchet teams were used as strike forces, operating in the jungle against targets located by recon teams operating from Khe Sanh.

A Hatchet team boards an aircraft during Operation Tailwind

=== Searching for MIAs ===
On 30 December 1968 a Hatchet Force of 40 men under the command of 1st Lt. James R. Jerson was inserted one mile east of the Laos/Cambodian border to search for the missing Sergeant Robert Francis Scherdin. The Hatchet force triggered a claymore and were then attacked by two company-sized NVA forces. Three and a half hours later the Hatchet Force managed to blast a landing zone from which they were extracted with 50% casualties, including Jerson. Jerson's second in command, Robert L. Howard, later received the Medal of Honor. A second team of Montagnards were sent in during January 1969 and spent four days searching for Scherdin, before being killed in a helicopter crash after extraction. Scherdin remains listed as missing in action.

On 23 June 1971 a Hatchet force were inserted 60 miles west-southwest of Da Nang, five miles from the Laos/Cambodia border. They were tasked with locating Madison Alexander Strohlein, a sergeant inserted as part of a four-man HALO team the day before. The Hatchet team located a CAR-15 rifle and a parachute at the base of a tree, however Strohlein was missing and there was no evidence of blood or bandages. Strohlein remains listed as missing in action.

=== Operation Tailwind ===
Between 11 September and 13 September 1970, a covert incursion took place into southeastern Laos, which was led by a Hatchet Force, in order to create a diversion for an offensive by the Royal Lao Army against the People's Army of Vietnam. The mission, commanded by Captain Eugene McCarley, consisted of 16 Americans and 110 Montagnard tribesmen and landed 60 miles to the west of their launch site at Dak To. Equipment caches and enemy troop dispositions were located and bombarded from the air, despite constant enemy contact, and two footlockers of intelligence were retrieved. The Hatchet Force then divided into three teams and were evacuated, leaving at least 54 PAVN soldiers killed. The raid would attract controversy in 1998 after a CNN report, alleging the use of sarin and other war crimes, by Peter Arnett, Producer April Oliver, Producer Jack Smith, Sr. Producer Pam Hill, and others. Later these allegations were retracted. CNN News Group Chairman Tom Johnson said in a statement read on the air, "There is insufficient evidence that sarin or any other deadly gas was used...CNN's system of checks and balances...failed in this case." The network fired Oliver and Smith following an internal investigation.
