= 19th Field Artillery Regiment =

US military unit

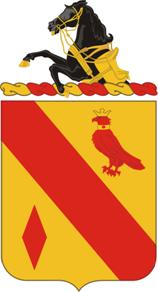
- Coat of arms
- Active: 1916
- Country: United States
- Branch: Army
- Type: Field artillery
- Motto(s): Per Scintillam Flamma (Through The Spark, The Flame)

Insignia
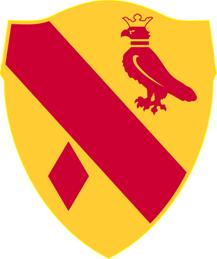
- Distinctive unit insignia

The 19th Field Artillery Regiment is a Field Artillery regiment of the United States Army first formed in 1916.

== History ==
The Regular Army formed the 19th Field Artillery on 1 July 1916.

== Distinctive unit insignia ==
- Description

A gold color metal and enamel device 1 1/16 inches (2.7 cm) in height overall consisting of a shield blazoned: Or, a bend Gules between in chief an eagle close of the same ducally crowned and gorged with a collar of the first and in base a fusil of the like.

- Symbolism

Scarlet and yellow are the colors used for Artillery. The red diamond is indicative of the 5th Division with which the Regiment served after it was organized in 1917 by transfer of men from the 7th Division. The red bend, from the arms of Lorraine, commemorates the baptism of fire from the Regiment in taking Frapelle east of St. Die in the Vosges in the Lorraine. The eagle, the device of St Mihiel, represents the heavy fighting the Regiment participated in at St. Mihiel.

- Background

The distinctive unit insignia was originally approved for the 19th Field Artillery Regiment on 15 April 1935. It was redesignated for the 19th Field Artillery Battalion on 14 November 1940. On 27 June 1958, it was redesignated for the 19th Artillery Regiment. Effective 1 September 1971, the insignia was redesignated for the 19th Field Artillery Regiment. The description and symbolism were revised on 14 May 1982.

== Coat of arms ==
- Blazon
- Shield

Or, a bend Gules between in chief an eagle close of the same ducally crowned and gorged with a collar of the first charged with a Lorraine cross of the second and in base a fusil of the like.

- Crest

On a wreath of the colors (Or and Gules) a demi horse Sable hoofed and tongued Or with draft harness of the like. Motto PER SCINTILLAM FLAMMA (Through The Spark, The Flame).

- Symbolism

Scarlet and yellow are the colors used for Artillery. The red diamond is indicative of the 5th Division with which the Regiment served after it was organized in 1917 by transfer of men from the 7th Division. The red bend, from the arms of Lorraine, commemorates the baptism of fire for the Regiment in taking Frapelle east of St. Die in the Vosges in the Lorraine. The motto alludes to an incident at Frapelle when Battery A had trouble with one of the lights which served as an aiming point. Private Louis Birtz went out in front of his piece and held lighted matches up for the gunner to sight his piece. All through the barrage he lay there. The eagle, the device of St. Mihiel, represents the heavy fighting the Regiment participated in at St. Mihiel.

- Background

The coat of arms was originally approved for the 19th Field Artillery Regiment on 24 January 1922. It was amended to correct the motto on 30 January 1922. On 18 November 1940, it was redesignated for the 19th Field Artillery Battalion. The coat of arms was redesignated for the 19th Artillery Regiment on 27 June 1958. Effective 1 September 1971, it was redesignated for the 19th Field Artillery Regiment. The coat of arms was amended to revise the symbolism on 14 May 1982.

== Current configuration ==
- 1st Battalion 19th Field Artillery Regiment (United States)- Served as a Basic Combat Training battalion at Fort Sill.
- 2nd Battalion 19th Field Artillery Regiment
- 3rd Battalion 19th Field Artillery Regiment (United States)
- 4th Battalion 19th Field Artillery Regiment
- 5th Battalion 19th Field Artillery Regiment
- 6th Battalion 19th Field Artillery Regiment (United States)

== See also ==
- Field Artillery Branch (United States)
- U.S. Army Coast Artillery Corps
