= MGR (disambiguation) =

M. G. Ramachandran (1917–1987) was the former Chief Minister of Tamil Nadu.

MGR may also refer to:

- ManaGeR (MGR), graphical window system
- Mere Gook Rule (MGR), controversially claimed Vietnam War engagement policy
- Merry-go-round train, British freight-train design
- Metal Gear Rising: Revengeance, a video game developed by Platinum Games
- Postal code for Mġarr, Malta

Mgr. is an honorific or abbreviation for:

- Manager (disambiguation)
- Monseigneur (also Msgr.)
- Monsignor (also Msgr., Mons.)
