= Admin =

Admin may refer to:

- An abbreviated form of the words administration or administrator, particularly in computing contexts
- Admin, son of Arni, a minor biblical figure
