= My Lai massacre =

1968 U.S. war crime during the Vietnam War

My Lai Massacre
- Part of the Vietnam War
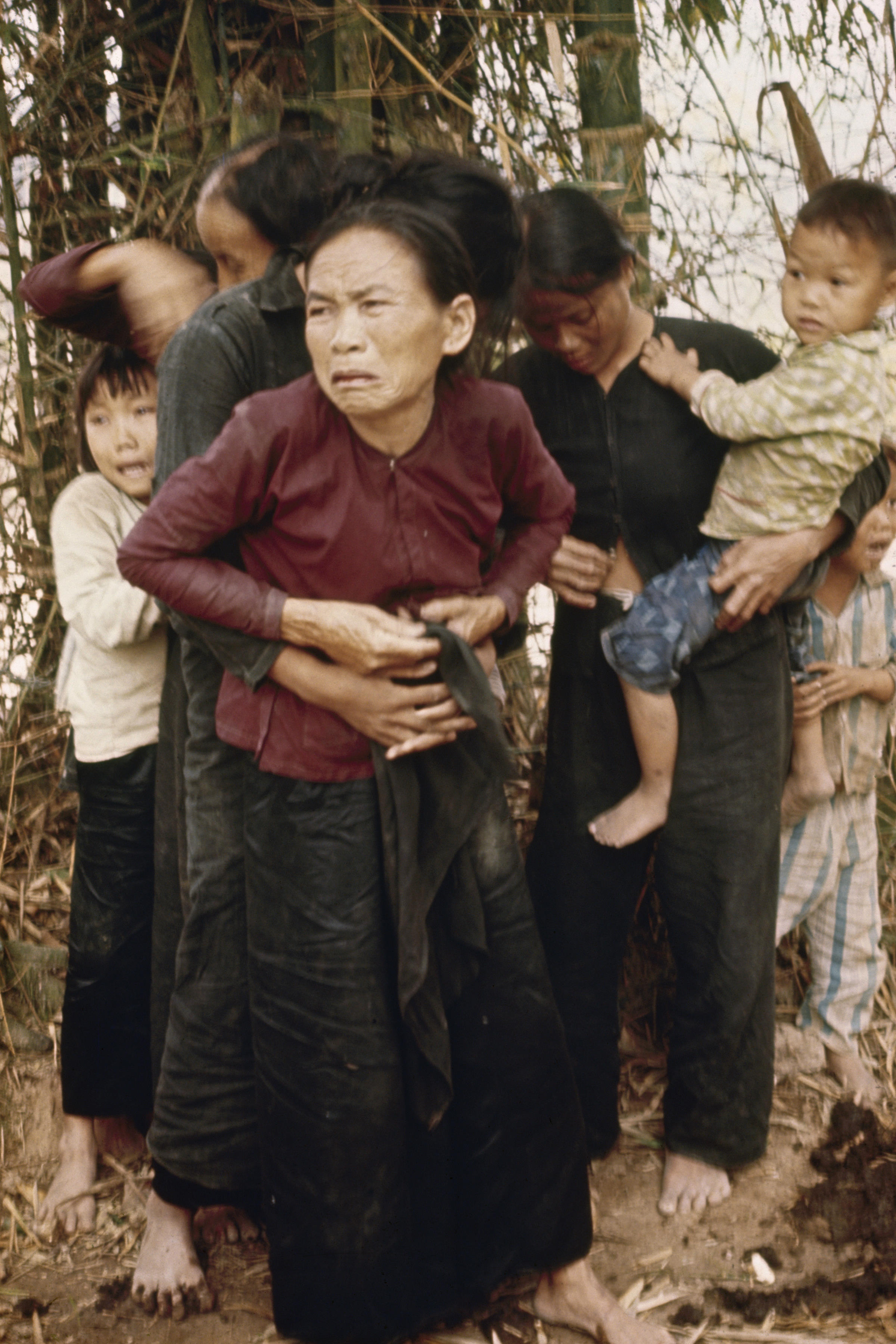
- South Vietnamese women and children in Mỹ Lai photographed moments before being killed in the massacre. According to photographer Ronald L. Haeberle, soldiers had attempted to rip the blouse off the woman in the back while her mother, in the front of the photo, tried to protect her.
- Location: 15°10′42″N 108°52′10″E; Sơn Mỹ village, Sơn Tịnh district, Quảng Ngãi province, South Vietnam
- Date: 16 March 1968 (58 years ago)
- Target: Mỹ Lai 4 and Mỹ Khê 4 hamlets
- Attack type: Massacre, mass murder, war rape, torture, arson, war crime
- Deaths: Vietnamese government lists 504 killed in both Mỹ Lai and Mỹ Khê; United States Army lists 347 (not including Mỹ Khê killings)
- Perpetrators: United States Army: C Company; 1st Battalion; 20th Infantry Regiment; B Company; 4th Battalion; 3rd Infantry Regiment; 23rd Infantry Division
- Defenders: Hugh Thompson Jr., Lawrence Colburn, Glenn Andreotta
- Motive: Anti-Vietnamese sentiment, cultural violence in the U.S. military, lack of discipline
- Convictions: Premeditated murder (22 counts), assault with intent to murder
- Sentence: Life imprisonment; commuted to three years' house arrest by President Richard Nixon
- Convicted: William Calley

The My Lai Massacre (/miː laɪ/ MEE LY; Vietnamese: Thảm sát Mỹ Lai [t̺ʰâm ʂǎt mǐˀ lāj]) was a U.S. Army war crime committed on 16 March 1968, involving the mass murder of between 347 and 504 civilians, almost all women, children and elderly men, in Sơn Mỹ village, Quảng Ngãi province, South Vietnam, during the Vietnam War. Some of the female victims, including children as young as 12, were gang-raped and their bodies mutilated. The incident is the largest massacre by U.S. soldiers in the 20th century.

On the morning of the massacre, C Company, commanded by Captain Ernest Medina, entered the hamlet of Mỹ Lai 4 expecting to confront the Viet Cong's Local Force 48th Battalion, which was not there. The killings began as troops searched for guerillas and continued even after it became clear none were present. Soldiers rounded up villagers, held them in the open, and massacred them using automatic weapons, bayonets, and grenades; one large group was executed in an irrigation ditch. They also burned homes, poisoned wells, and slaughtered livestock. Warrant Officer Hugh Thompson Jr. and his helicopter crew attempted to intervene and halt the attack. In the nearby hamlet of Mỹ Khê 4, B Company killed an additional 60 to 155 villagers.

The massacre was originally reported as a victory against Viet Cong troops, and was covered up in initial investigations by the U.S. Army. The efforts of veteran Ronald Ridenhour and journalist Seymour Hersh broke the news of the massacre to the American public in November 1969, prompting global outrage and contributing to domestic opposition to involvement in the war.

Twenty-six soldiers were charged with criminal offenses, but only Lieutenant William Calley Jr., the leader of 1st Platoon in C Company, was convicted. He was found guilty of murdering 22 villagers and originally given a life sentence, but served three-and-a-half years under house arrest after his sentence was commuted. The perpetrating American units were from C Company, 1st Battalion, 20th Infantry Regiment, 11th Brigade and B Company, 4th Battalion, 3rd Infantry Regiment, 11th Brigade of the 23rd (Americal) Division (organized as part of Task Force Barker).

Research has highlighted that the My Lai Massacre was not an isolated war crime. Nick Turse places it within a larger pattern of American atrocities enabled by deliberate policies from commanders, such as "free-fire zones" and "body counts," as well as widespread racism amongst American military personnel. Many other atrocities were also covered up by commanders. Following the massacre, a Pentagon task force called the Vietnam War Crimes Working Group (VWCWG) was set up which verified numerous other incidents.

== Background ==
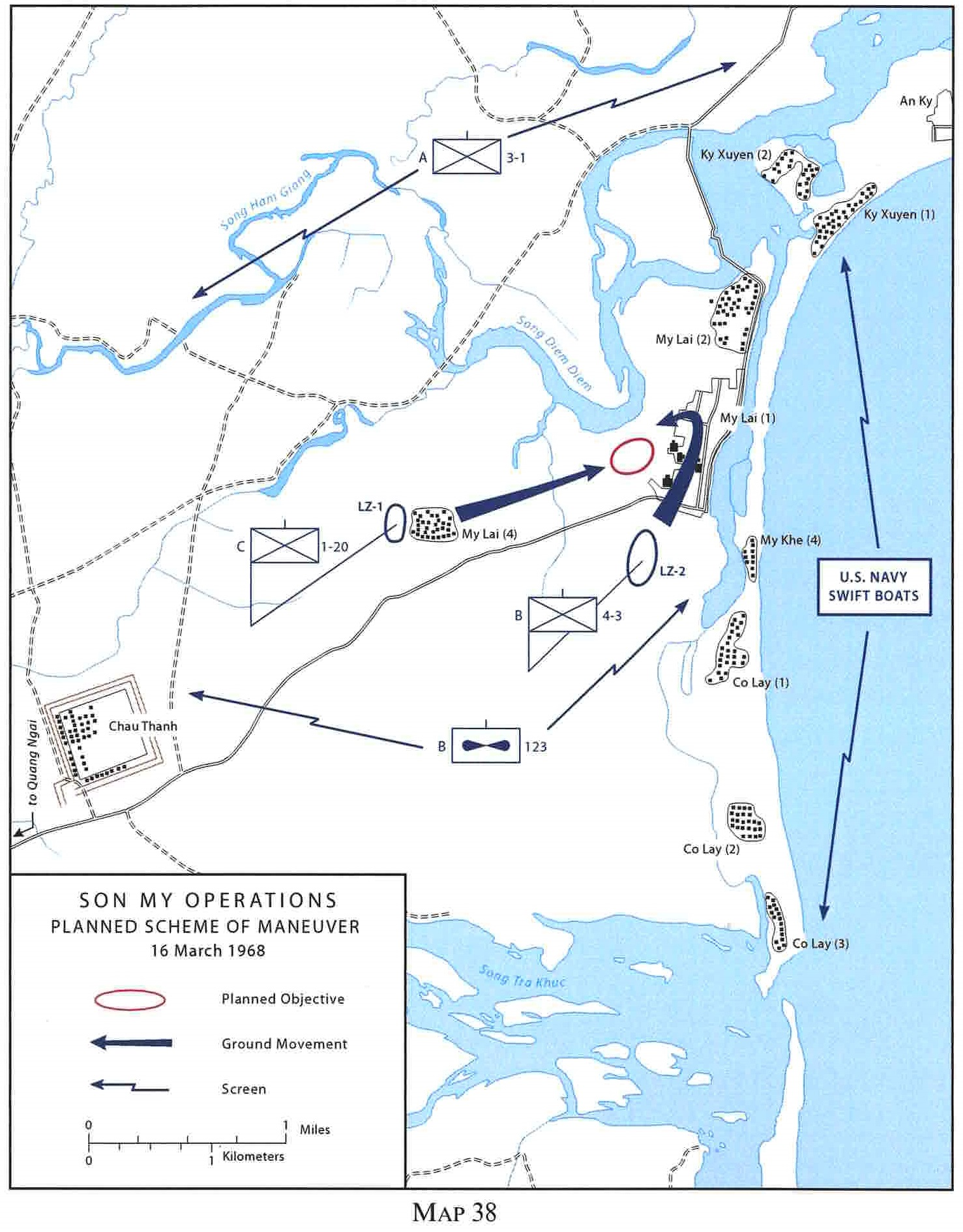
Sơn Mỹ operations, 16 March 1968

Charlie Company, 1st Battalion, 20th Infantry Regiment, 11th Brigade, 23rd Infantry Division, arrived in South Vietnam in December 1967. Though their first three months in Vietnam passed without any direct contact with People's Army of Vietnam or Viet Cong (VC) forces, by mid-March the company had suffered 28 casualties involving mines or booby-traps.

During the Tet Offensive in January 1968, attacks were carried out in Quảng Ngãi province by the VC 48th Local Force Battalion. U.S. military intelligence assumed that the 48th Battalion, having retreated and dispersed, was taking refuge in the village of Sơn Mỹ, in Quảng Ngãi province. A number of specific hamlets within that village – designated Mỹ Lai (1) through Mỹ Lai (6) – were suspected of harboring the 48th. Sơn Mỹ was located southwest of the Batangan Peninsula, a VC stronghold throughout the war.

In February and March 1968, the U.S. Military Assistance Command, Vietnam (MACV) was aggressively trying to regain the strategic initiative in South Vietnam after the Tet Offensive, and the search-and-destroy operation against the 48th Battalion thought to be located in Sơn Mỹ became a small part of the U.S. military's overall strategy. Task Force Barker (TF Barker), a battalion-sized ad hoc unit of 11th Brigade, was to be deployed for the operation. It was formed in January 1968, composed of three rifle companies of the 11th Brigade, including Charlie Company, led by Lieutenant Colonel (LTC) Frank A. Barker. Sơn Mỹ village was included in the area of operations of TF Barker. The area of operations (AO) was codenamed Muscatine AO, after Muscatine County, Iowa, the home county of the 23rd Division's commander, Major General Samuel W. Koster.

In February 1968, TF Barker had already tried to secure Sơn Mỹ, with limited success. After that, the village area began to be referred to as Pinkville by TF Barker troops. The U.S. Army slang name for the hamlets and sub-hamlets in that area was Pinkville, due to the reddish-pink color used on military maps to denote a more densely populated area, and the carnage was initially referred to as the Pinkville Massacre.

On 16–18 March, TF Barker planned to engage and destroy the remnants of the 48th Battalion, allegedly hiding in the Sơn Mỹ village area. Before the engagement, Colonel Oran K. Henderson, the 11th Brigade commander, urged his officers to "go in there aggressively, close with the enemy and wipe them out for good". In turn, LTC Barker reportedly ordered the 1st Battalion commanders to burn the houses, kill the livestock, destroy food supplies, and destroy or poison the wells.

On the eve of the attack, at the Charlie Company briefing, Captain Ernest Medina told his men that nearly all the civilian residents of the hamlets in Sơn Mỹ village would have left for the market by 07:00, and that any who remained would most likely be VC or VC sympathizers. He was asked whether the order included the killing of women and children. Those present later gave differing accounts of Medina's response. Some, including platoon leaders, testified that the orders, as they understood them, were to kill all VC and North Vietnamese combatants and "suspects" (including women and children, as well as all animals), to burn the village, and pollute the wells. He was quoted as saying, "They're all VC, now go and get them", and was heard to reply to the question "Who is my enemy?", by saying, "Anybody that was running from us, hiding from us, or appeared to be the enemy. If a man was running, shoot him, sometimes even if a woman with a rifle was running, shoot her."

At Calley's trial, one defense witness testified that he remembered Medina instructing to destroy everything in the village that was "walking, crawling or growing".

Charlie Company was to enter the village of Sơn Mỹ spearheaded by 1st Platoon, engage the enemy, and flush them out. The other two companies from TF Barker were ordered to secure the area and provide support if needed. The area was designated a free-fire zone, where American forces were allowed to deploy artillery and air strikes in populated areas, without consideration of risk to civilian or non-combatant lives. Varnado Simpson, a rifleman in Charlie Company, said, "We were told to leave nothing standing. We did what we were told, regardless of whether they were civilians."

== Massacre ==
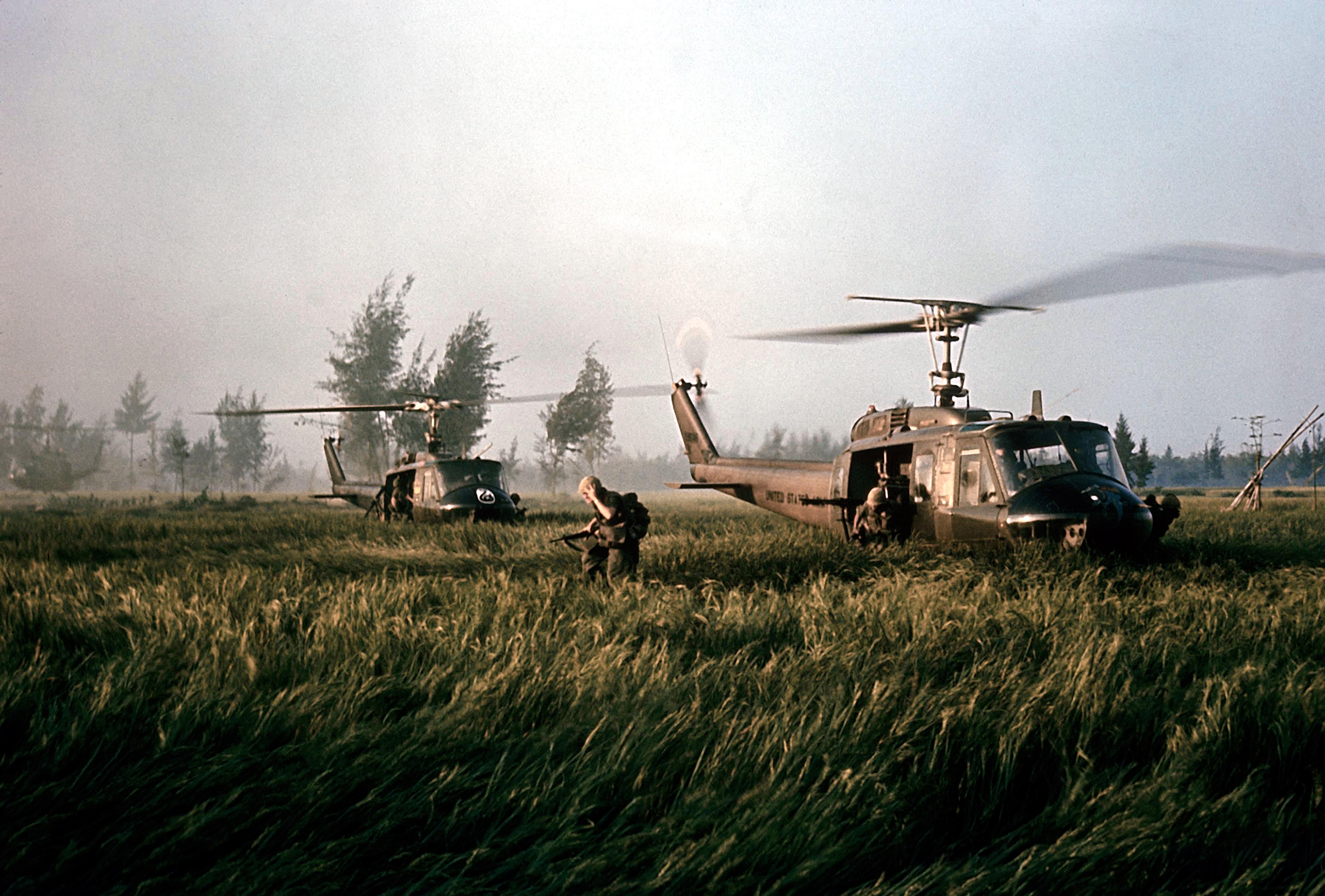
American soldiers from Company C disembark helicopters outside the hamlets.

On the morning of 16 March at 07:30, around 100 soldiers from Charlie Company led by Medina, following a short artillery and helicopter gunship barrage, landed in helicopters at Sơn Mỹ, a patchwork of individual homesteads, grouped settlements, rice paddies, irrigation ditches, dikes, and dirt roads, connecting an assortment of hamlets and sub-hamlets. The largest among them were the hamlets Mỹ Lai, Cổ Lũy, Mỹ Khê, and Tu Cung.

The GIs expected to engage the VC Local Force 48th Battalion, which was one of the VC's most successful units. Although the GIs were not fired upon after landing, they still suspected there were VC hiding underground or in the huts. Confirming their suspicions, the gunships engaged several VC in the vicinity of Mỹ Lai, killing four; later, one weapon was retrieved from the site.

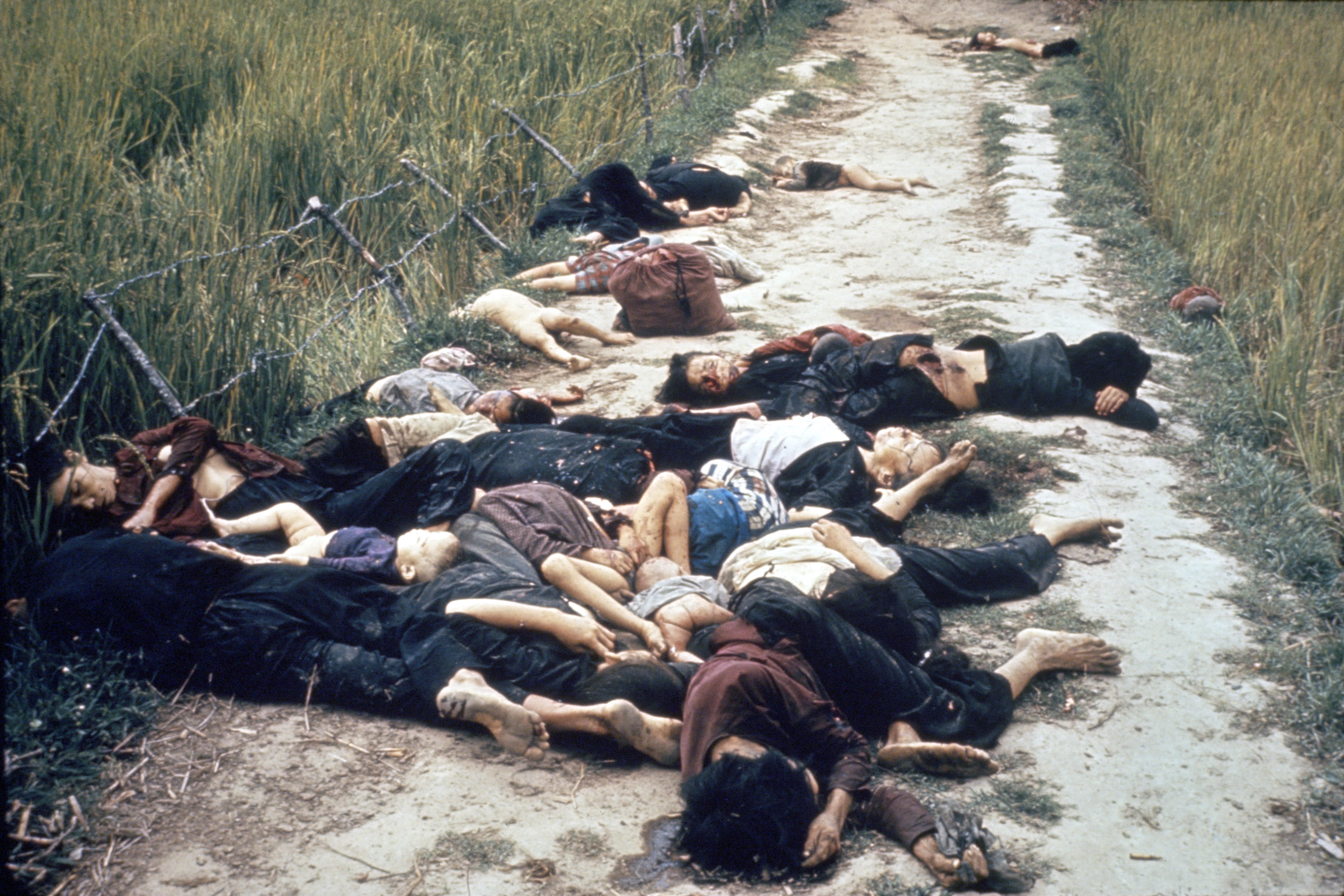
Photo taken by U.S. Army photographer Ronald L. Haeberle in the aftermath of the massacre, showing mostly women and children dead on a road— famously used in the "And babies" poster

According to the operational plan, 1st Platoon, led by Second Lieutenant (2LT) William Calley, and 2nd Platoon, led by 2LT Stephen Brooks, entered the hamlet of Tu Cung in line formation at 08:00, while the 3rd Platoon, commanded by 2LT Jeffrey U. Lacross, and Captain Medina's command post remained outside. On approach, both platoons fired at people they saw in the rice fields and in the brush.

Instead of the expected enemy, the GIs found women, children and old men, many of whom were cooking breakfast over outdoor fires. The villagers were getting ready for a market day and at first did not panic or run away as they were herded into the hamlet's common spaces and homestead yards.

=== Massacres ===
Harry Stanley, a machine gunner from Charlie Company, testified during the U.S. Army Criminal Investigation Division (CID) inquiry that the killings started without warning. He first observed a member of 1st Platoon strike a Vietnamese man with a bayonet. Then the same trooper pushed another villager into a well and threw a grenade in the well. Next, he saw 15 or 20 people, mainly women and children, kneeling around a temple with burning incense. They were praying and crying. They were all executed by shots to the head.

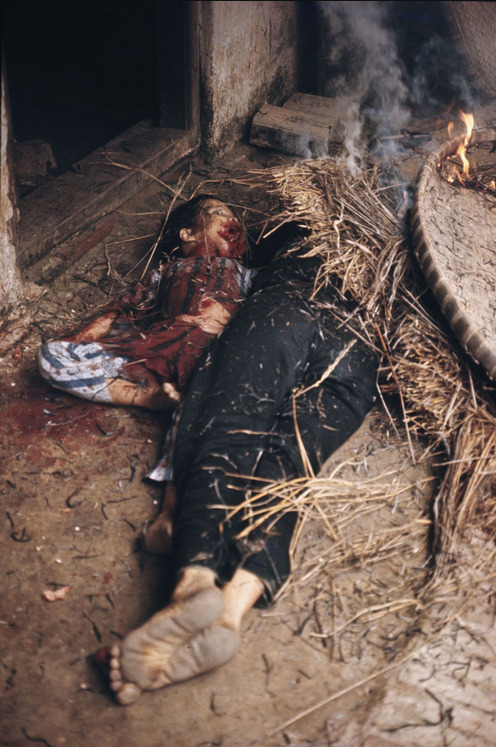
A dead Vietnamese woman and her child killed in the village.

Charlie Company then began killing indiscriminately in the village, throwing grenades into homes and gunning down elderly civilians sitting inside. Children fleeing for cover were also shot as they ran. In one instance, a mother fleeing from her house with her baby was shot down. When the infant fell on the ground, an American soldier killed the baby with a burst from his M-16.

Most of the killings occurred in the southern part of Tu Cung, a sub-hamlet of Xom Lang, which had 700 residents. Xom Lang was erroneously marked on the U.S. military operational maps of Quảng Ngãi province as Mỹ Lai.

A large group of approximately 70–80 villagers was rounded up by 1st Platoon in Xom Lang and led to an irrigation ditch east of the settlement. They were then pushed into the ditch and shot dead by soldiers after repeated orders issued by Calley, who was also shooting. PFC Paul Meadlo testified that he expended several M16 rifle magazines. He recollected that women were saying "No VC" and were trying to shield their children.

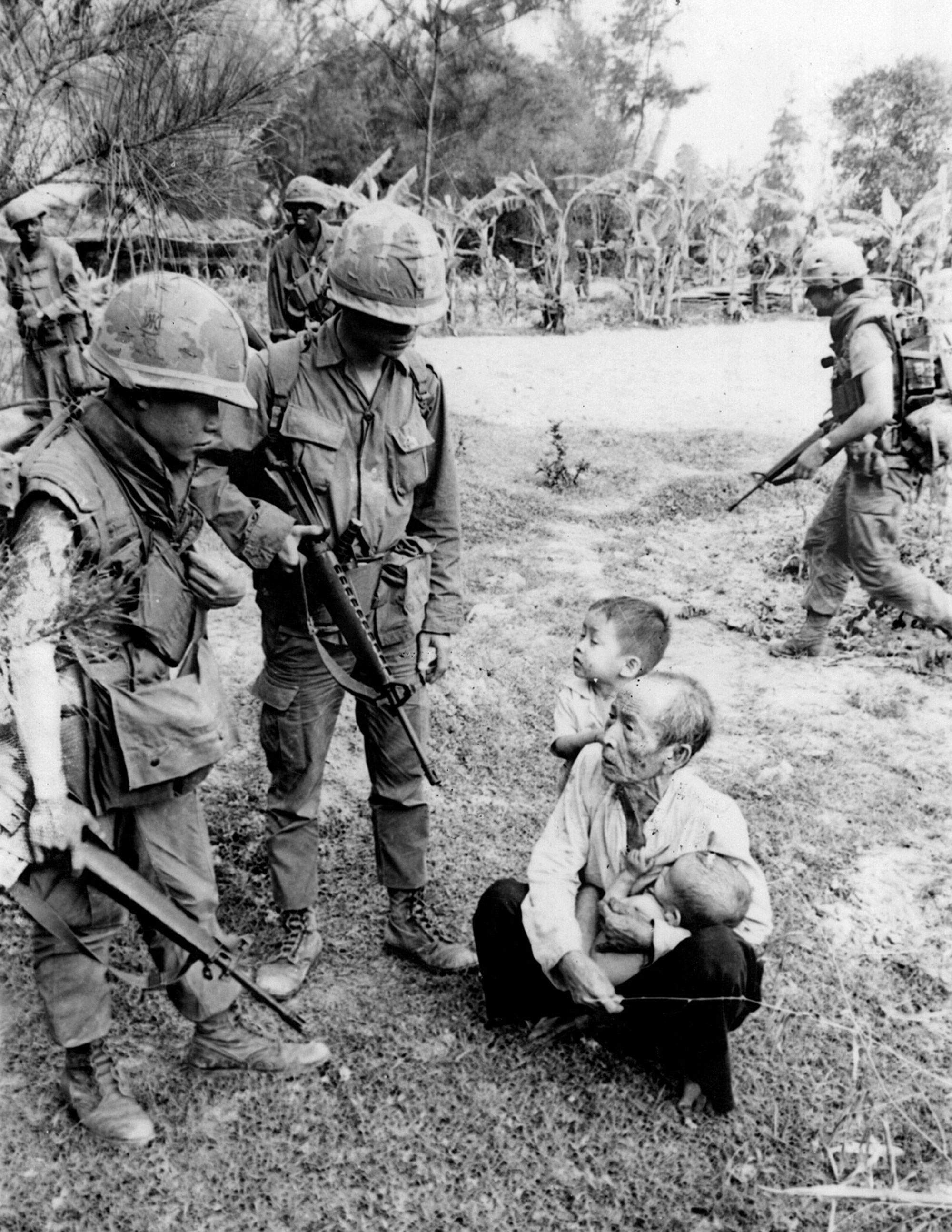
Photo taken by U.S. Army photographer Ronald L. Haeberle of U.S. soldiers interrogating Vietnamese civilians. Haeberle testified he did not know the fates of the civilians pictured.

He remembered that he was shooting old men and women, ranging in ages from grandmothers to teenagers, many with babies or small children in their arms, since he was convinced at that time that they were all booby-trapped with grenades and poised to attack. On another occasion during the security sweep of My Lai, Meadlo again fired into civilians side by side with Calley.

PFC Dennis Konti, a witness for the prosecution, told of one especially gruesome episode during the shooting, "A lot of women had thrown themselves on top of the children to protect them, and the children were alive at first. Then, the children who were old enough to walk got up and Calley began to shoot the children". Other 1st Platoon members testified that many of the deaths of individual Vietnamese men, women and children occurred inside Mỹ Lai during the security sweep. To ensure the hamlets could no longer offer support to the enemy, the livestock was shot as well. Charlie Company thus slaughtered chickens, pigs, cows and water buffalo wherever they saw them.

When PFC Michael Bernhardt entered the subhamlet of Xom Lang, the massacre was underway:

I walked up and saw these guys doing strange things ... Setting fire to the hootches and huts and waiting for people to come out and then shooting them ... going into the hootches and shooting them up ... gathering people in groups and shooting them ... As I walked in you could see piles of people all through the village ... all over. They were gathered up into large groups. I saw them shoot an M79 grenade launcher into a group of people who were still alive. But it was mostly done with a machine gun. They were shooting women and children just like anybody else. We met no resistance and I only saw three captured weapons. We had no casualties. It was just like any other Vietnamese village – old papa-sans, women and kids. As a matter of fact, I don't remember seeing one military-age male in the entire place, dead or alive.

One group of 20–50 villagers was herded south of Xom Lang and killed on a dirt road. According to U.S. Army photographer Sgt. Ronald Haeberle's eyewitness account of the massacre, in one instance,

There were some South Vietnamese people, maybe fifteen of them, women and children included, walking on a dirt road maybe 100 yards [90 m] away. All of a sudden the GIs just opened up with M16s. Beside the M16 fire, they were shooting at the people with M79 grenade launchers ... I couldn't believe what I was seeing.

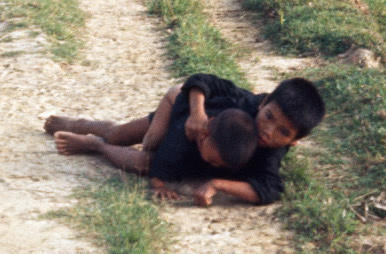
Two Vietnamese children lie on a road during the massacre.

Calley testified that he heard the shooting and arrived on the scene. He observed his men firing into a ditch with Vietnamese people inside, then began to take part in the shooting himself, using an M16 from a distance of no more than 5 feet (1.5 m). During the massacre, a helicopter landed on the other side of the ditch and the pilot asked Calley if they could provide any medical assistance to the wounded civilians in Mỹ Lai; Calley admitted replying that "a hand grenade was the only available means he had for their evacuation". At 11:00 Medina radioed an order to cease fire, and 1st Platoon took a break, during which they ate lunch.

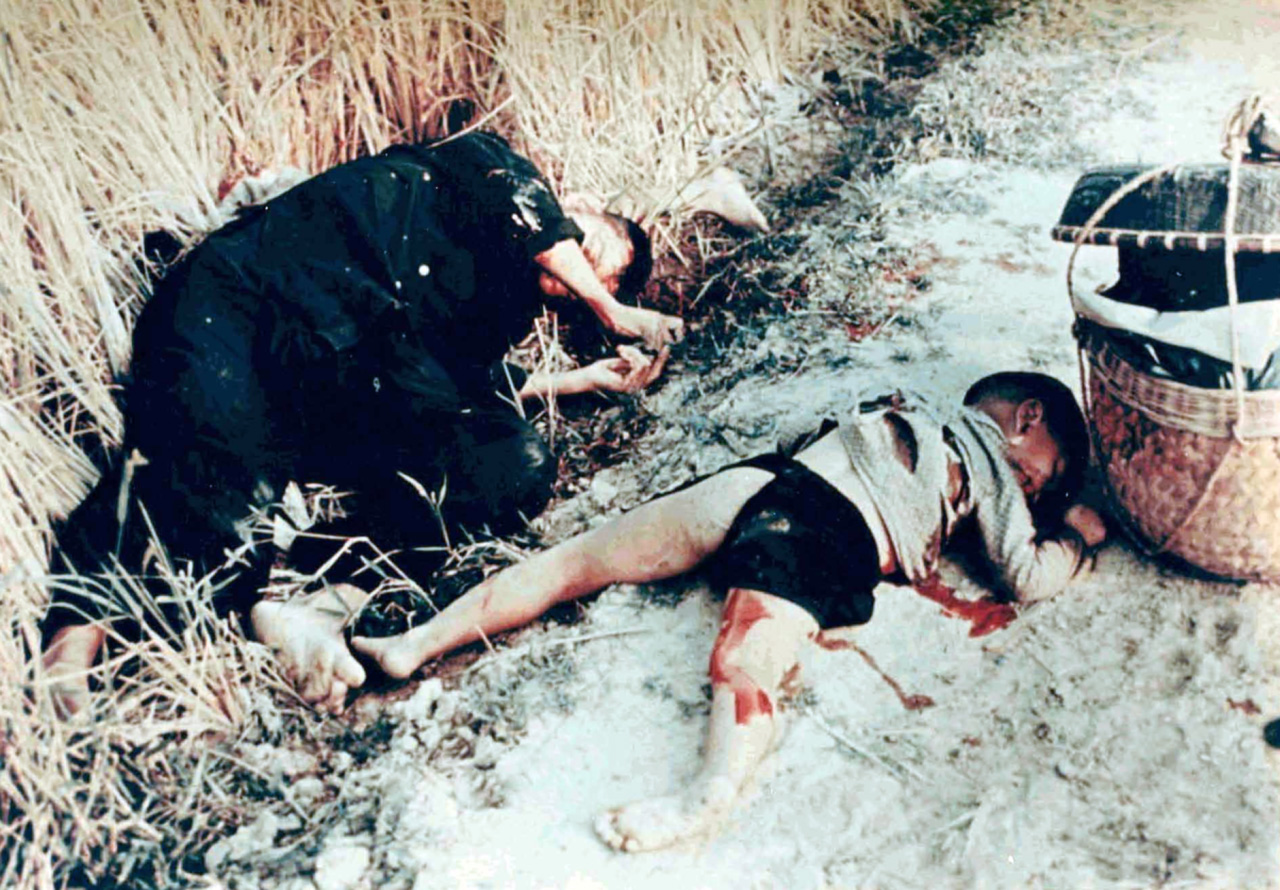
An unidentified man and child who were killed on a road

Members of 2nd Platoon killed at least 60–70 Vietnamese, as they swept through the northern half of Mỹ Lai and through Binh Tay, a small sub-hamlet about 400 metres (1,300 ft) north of Mỹ Lai. After the initial sweeps by 1st and 2nd Platoons, 3rd Platoon was dispatched to deal with any "remaining resistance". 3rd Platoon, which stayed in reserve, reportedly rounded up and killed a group of seven to 12 women and children.

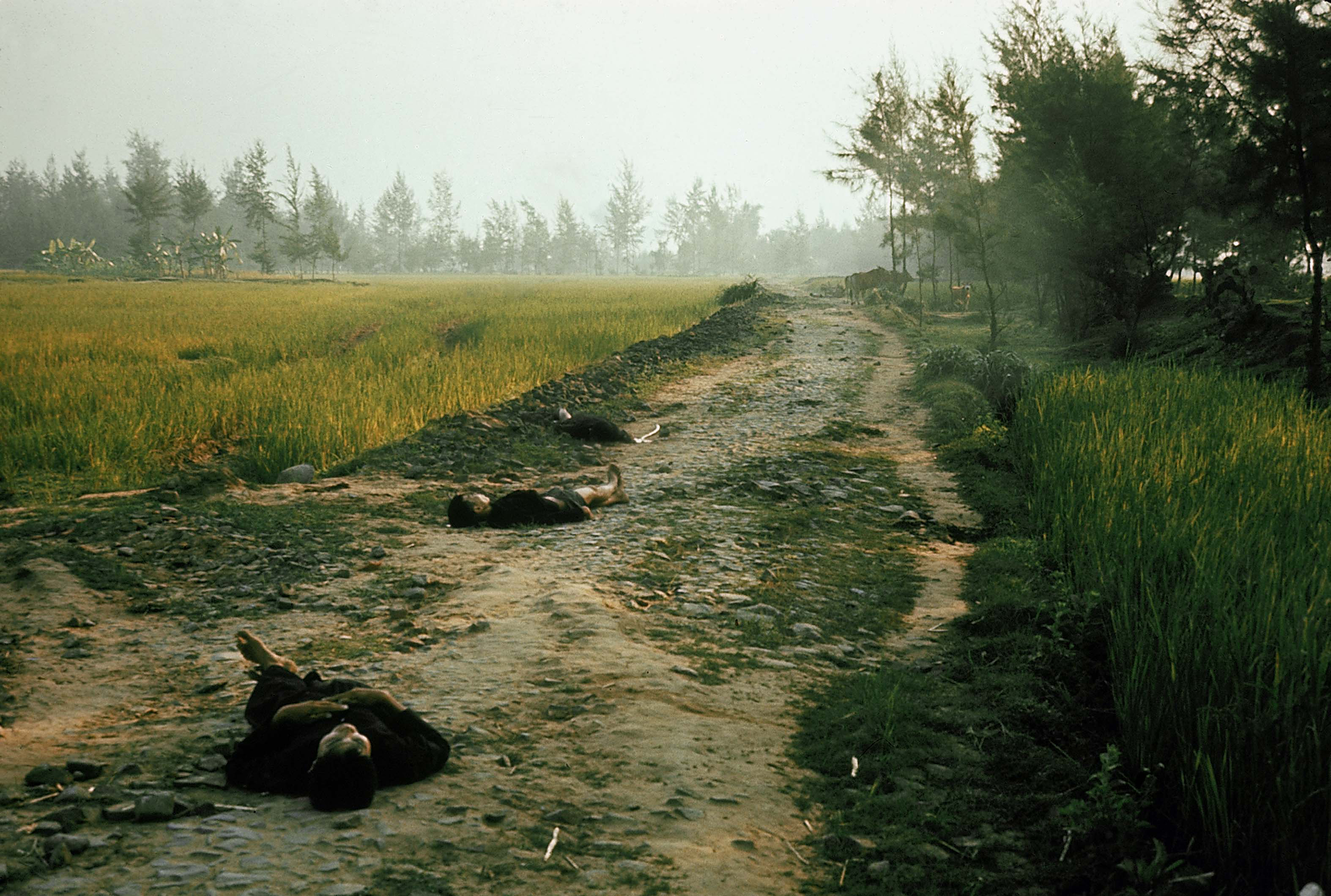
Dead civilians killed on a road near My Lai.

Since Charlie Company had not met any enemy opposition at Mỹ Lai and did not request back-up, Bravo Company, 4th Battalion, 3rd Infantry Regiment of TF Barker was transported by air between 08:15 and 08:30 3 km (2 mi) away. It attacked the subhamlet My Hoi of the hamlet known as Cổ Lũy, which was mapped by the Army as Mỹ Khê. During this operation, between 60 and 155 people, including women and children, were killed.

Over the remaining day, both companies were involved in the further burning and destruction of dwellings, as well as continued mistreatment of Vietnamese detainees. While it was noted in the courts-martial proceedings that some soldiers of Charlie Company did not participate in any killings, it was also noted they neither openly protested against them nor filed complaints later to their superiors.

William Thomas Allison, a professor of Military History at Georgia Southern University, wrote, "By midmorning, members of Charlie Company had killed hundreds of civilians and raped or assaulted countless women and young girls. They encountered no enemy fire and found no weapons in My Lai itself".

By the time the killings stopped, Charlie Company had suffered one casualty – a soldier who had intentionally shot himself in the foot to avoid participating in the massacre – and just three enemy weapons were confiscated.

=== Rapes ===
According to the Peers Commission Investigation, the U.S. government allocated commission for inquiry into the incident, concluded at least 20 Vietnamese women and girls were raped during the Mỹ Lai massacre. Since there had been little research over the case other than that of the Peers Commission, which solely accounts the cases with explicit rape signs like torn cloth and nudity, the actual number of rapes is not easy to estimate. According to the reports, the rape victims ranged between the ages of 10 and 45, with nine being under 18. The sexual assaults included gang rapes and sexual torture.

No U.S. serviceman was charged with rape. According to an eyewitness, as reported by Seymour Hersh in his book on the massacre, a woman was raped after her children were killed by the U.S. soldiers. Another Vietnamese villager also noticed soldiers rape a 13-year-old girl.

=== Helicopter crew intervention ===
Warrant Officer Hugh Thompson Jr., a helicopter pilot from Company B (Aero-Scouts), 123rd Aviation Battalion, Americal Division, saw dead and wounded civilians as he was flying his OH-23 over the village of Sơn Mỹ, providing observation for ground forces. The crew made several attempts to radio for help for the wounded. They landed their helicopter by a ditch, which they noted was full of bodies and in which they could discern movement by survivors. Thompson asked a sergeant he encountered there (David Mitchell of 1st Platoon) if he could help get the people out of the ditch; the sergeant replied that he would "help them out of their misery". Thompson, shocked and confused, then spoke with 2LT Calley, who claimed to be "just following orders". As the helicopter took off, Thompson saw Mitchell firing into the ditch.

Thompson and his crew witnessed an unarmed woman being kicked and shot at point-blank range by Medina, who later claimed that he thought she had a hand grenade. Thompson then saw a group of civilians at a bunker being approached by ground personnel. Thompson landed, and told his crew that if the soldiers shot at the villagers while he was trying to get them out of the bunker, then they were to open fire on the soldiers.

Thompson later testified that he spoke with a lieutenant (identified as Stephen Brooks of 2nd Platoon) and told him there were women and children in the bunker, and asked if the lieutenant would help get them out. According to Thompson, "he [the lieutenant] said the only way to get them out was with a hand grenade". Thompson testified that he then told Brooks to "just hold your men right where they are, and I'll get the kids out." He found 12–16 people in the bunker, coaxed them out and led them to the helicopter, standing with them while they were flown out in two groups.

Returning to Mỹ Lai, Thompson and other air crew members noticed several large groups of bodies. Spotting some survivors in the ditch, Thompson landed again. A crew member, Specialist 4 Glenn Andreotta, entered the ditch and returned with a bloodied but apparently unharmed four-year-old girl, who was then flown to safety.

Upon returning to the LZ Dottie base, Thompson reported to his section leader, Captain Barry Lloyd, that the American infantry were no different from Nazis in their slaughter of innocent civilians:

It's mass murder out there. They're rounding them up and herding them in ditches and then just shooting them.

Thompson then reported what he had seen to his company commander, Major Frederic W. Watke, using terms such as "murder" and "needless and unnecessary killings". Thompson's statements were confirmed by other helicopter pilots and air crew members.

For his actions at Mỹ Lai, Thompson was awarded the Distinguished Flying Cross, while his crew members Glenn Andreotta and Lawrence Colburn were awarded the Bronze Star. Andreotta was awarded his medal posthumously, as he was killed in Vietnam on 8 April 1968. As the DFC citation included a fabricated account of rescuing a young girl from Mỹ Lai from "intense crossfire", Thompson threw his medal away. He later received a Purple Heart for other services in Vietnam.

In March 1998, the helicopter crew's medals were replaced by the Soldier's Medal, the highest the U.S. Army can award for bravery not involving direct conflict with the enemy. The medal citations state they were "for heroism above and beyond the call of duty while saving the lives of at least 10 Vietnamese civilians during the unlawful massacre of non-combatants by American forces at My Lai".

Thompson initially refused to accept the medal when the U.S. Army wanted to award it quietly. He demanded it be done publicly and that his crew be honored in the same way.

== Aftermath ==
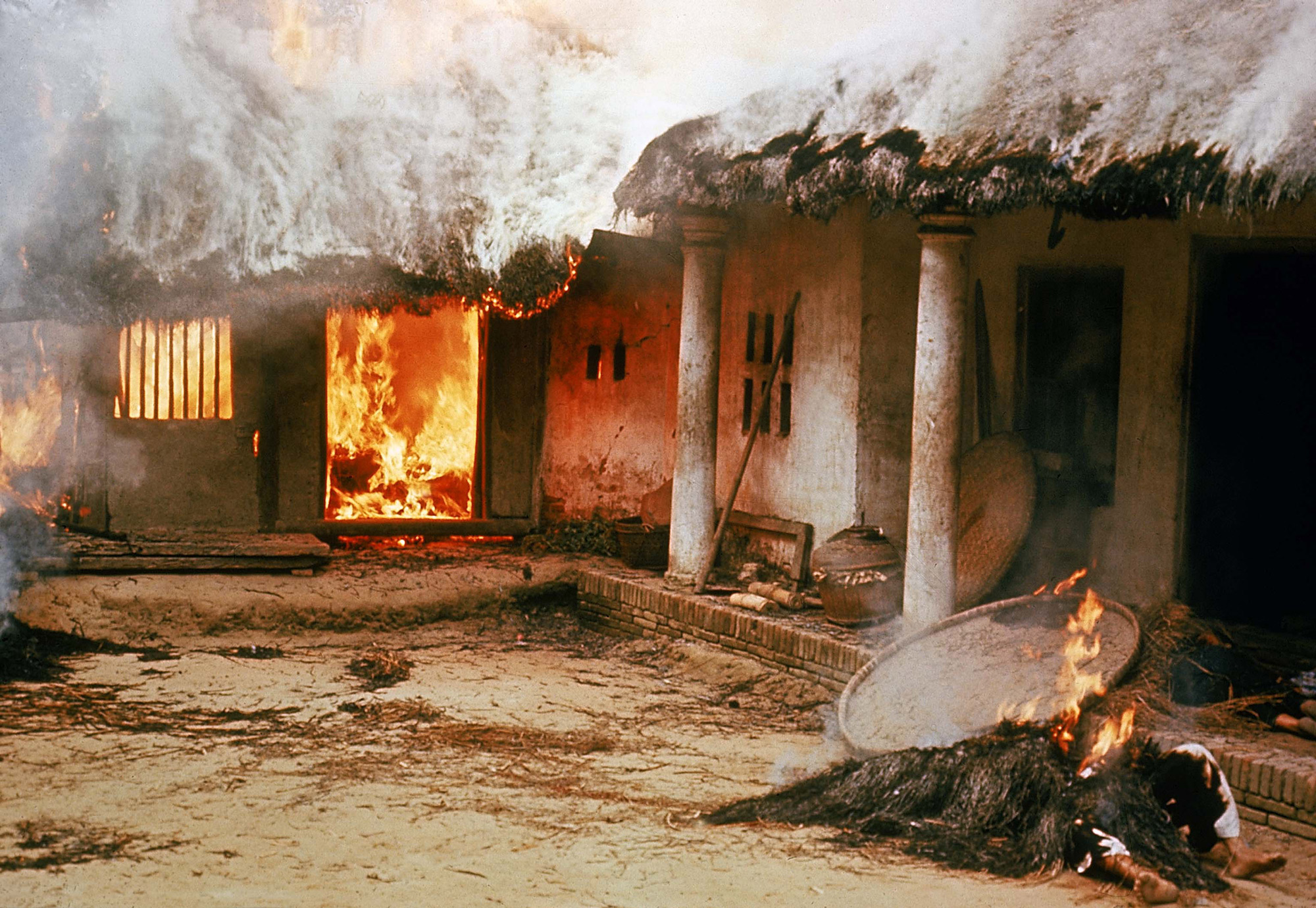
Dead bodies outside a burning home

After returning to base at about 11:00, Thompson reported the massacre to his superiors. His allegations of civilian killings quickly reached LTC Barker, the operation's overall commander. Barker radioed his executive officer to find out from Medina what was happening on the ground. Medina then gave the cease-fire order to Charlie Company to "cut [the killing] out – knock it off".

Since Thompson made an official report of the civilian killings, he was interviewed by Colonel Oran Henderson, the commander of the 11th Infantry Brigade. Concerned, senior American officers canceled similar planned operations by Task Force Barker against other villages (My Lai 5, My Lai 1, etc.) in Quảng Ngãi province. Despite Thompson's revealing information, Henderson issued a Letter of Commendation to Medina on 27 March 1968.

The following day, 28 March, Barker submitted a combat action report for the 16 March operation, in which he stated that the operation in Mỹ Lai was a success, with 128 VC combatants killed. The Americal Division commander, General Koster, sent a congratulatory message to Charlie Company.

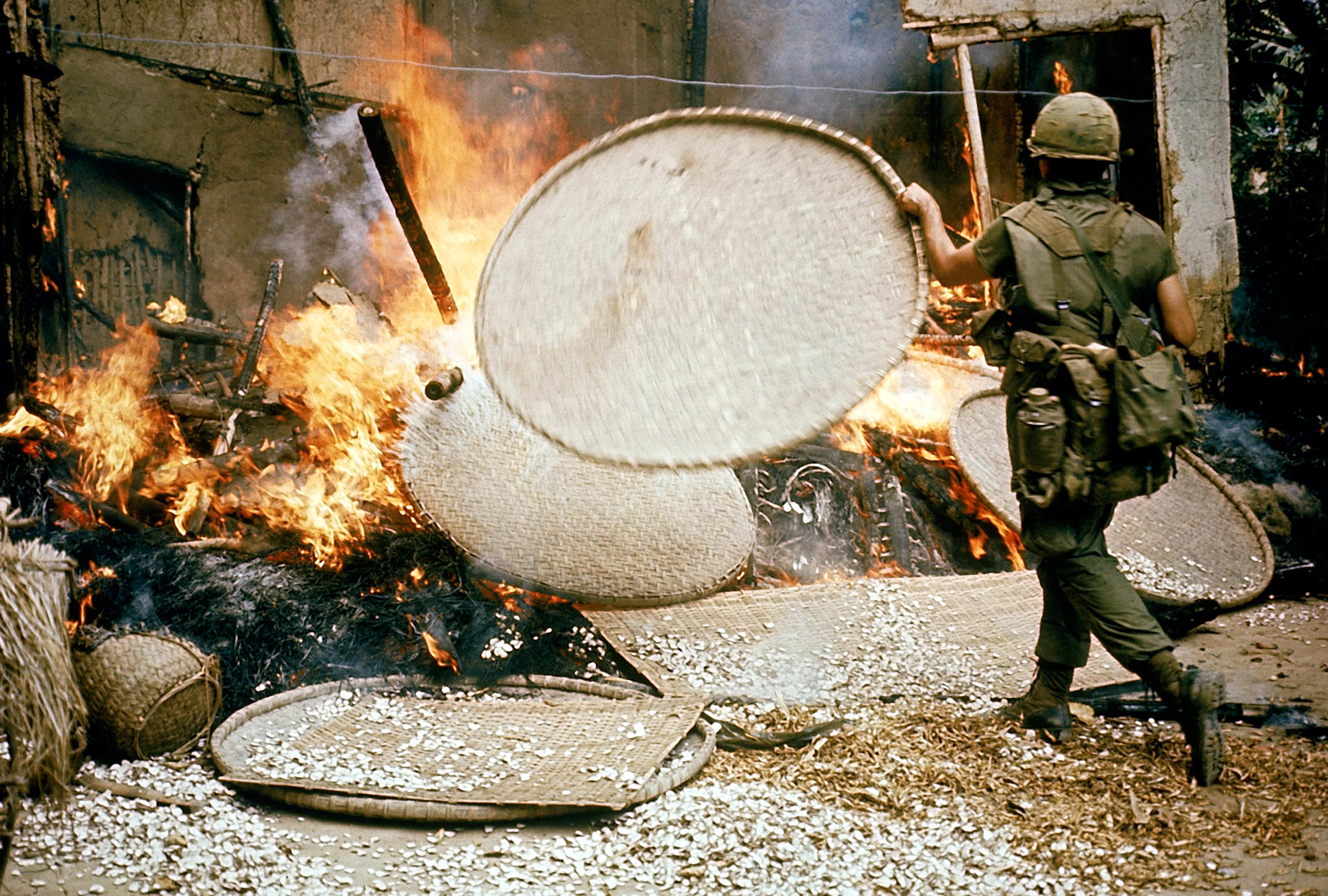
An American soldier burns a dwelling in My Lai.

General William C. Westmoreland, the head of MACV, also congratulated Charlie Company, 1st Battalion, 20th Infantry for "outstanding action", saying that they had "dealt [the] enemy [a] heavy blow". Later, after learning of the massacre, he wrote in his memoir that it was "the conscious massacre of defenseless babies, children, mothers, and old men in a kind of diabolical slow-motion nightmare that went on for the better part of a day, with a cold-blooded break for lunch".

Owing to the chaotic circumstances of the war and the U.S. Army's decision not to undertake a definitive body count of noncombatants in Vietnam, the number of civilians killed at Mỹ Lai cannot be stated with certainty. Estimates vary from source to source, with 347 and 504 being the most commonly cited figures. The memorial at the site of the massacre lists 504 names, with ages ranging from one to 82. A later investigation by the U.S. Army arrived at a lower figure of 347 deaths, the official U.S. estimate. The official estimate by the local government remains 504.

== Investigation and cover-up ==
Initial reports claimed "128 Viet Cong and 22 civilians" had been killed in the village during a "fierce fire fight". Westmoreland congratulated the unit on the "outstanding job". As relayed at the time by Stars and Stripes magazine, "U.S. infantrymen had killed 128 Communists in a bloody day-long battle."

On 16 March 1968, in the official press briefing known as the "Five O'Clock Follies", a mimeographed release included this passage: "In an action today, Americal Division forces killed 128 enemy near Quang Ngai City. Helicopter gunships and artillery missions supported the ground elements throughout the day."

Initial investigations of the Mỹ Lai operation were undertaken by Colonel Henderson, under orders from the Americal Division's executive officer, Brigadier General George H. Young. Henderson interviewed several soldiers involved in the incident, then issued a written report in late April claiming that some 20 civilians were inadvertently killed during the operation. According to Henderson's report, the civilian casualties that occurred were accidental and mainly attributed to long-range artillery fire. The Army at this time was still describing the event as a military victory that had resulted in the deaths of 128 enemy combatants.

Six months later, Tom Glen, a 21-year-old soldier of the 11th Light Infantry Brigade, wrote a letter to General Creighton Abrams, the new MACV commander. He described an ongoing and routine brutality against Vietnamese civilians on the part of American forces in Vietnam that he had personally witnessed, and then concluded,

It would indeed be terrible to find it necessary to believe that an American soldier that harbors such racial intolerance and disregard for justice and human feeling is a prototype of all American national character; yet the frequency of such soldiers lends credulity to such beliefs. ... What has been outlined here I have seen not only in my own unit, but also in others we have worked with, and I fear it is universal. If this is indeed the case, it is a problem which cannot be overlooked, but can through a more firm implementation of the codes of MACV (Military Assistance Command Vietnam) and the Geneva Conventions, perhaps be eradicated.

Colin Powell, then a 31-year-old Army major serving as an assistant chief of staff of operations for the Americal Division, was charged with investigating the letter, which did not specifically refer to Mỹ Lai, as Glen had limited knowledge of the events there. In his report, Powell wrote, "In direct refutation of this portrayal is the fact that relations between Americal Division soldiers and the Vietnamese people are excellent." A 2018 U.S. Army case study of the massacre noted that Powell "investigated the allegations described in the [Glen] letter. He proved unable to uncover either widespread unnecessary killings, war crimes, or any facts related to My Lai". Powell's handling of the assignment was later characterized by some observers as "whitewashing" the atrocities of Mỹ Lai.

In May 2004, Powell, then United States Secretary of State, told CNN's Larry King, "I mean, I was in a unit that was responsible for Mỹ Lai. I got there after Mỹ Lai happened. So, in war, these sorts of horrible things happen every now and again, but they are still to be deplored."

Seven months prior to the massacre at Mỹ Lai, on Robert McNamara's orders, the Inspector General of the U.S. Defense Department investigated press coverage of alleged atrocities committed in South Vietnam. In August 1967, the 200-page report "Alleged Atrocities by U.S. Military Forces in South Vietnam" was completed.

Independently of Glen, Specialist 5 Ronald L. Ridenhour, a former door gunner from the Aviation Section, Headquarters Company, 11th Infantry Brigade, sent a letter in March 1969 to 30 members of Congress imploring them to investigate the circumstances surrounding the "Pinkville" incident. He and his pilot, Warrant Officer Gilbert Honda, flew over Mỹ Lai several days after the operation and observed a scene of complete destruction. At one point, they hovered over a dead Vietnamese woman with a patch of the 11th Brigade on her body.

Ridenhour himself had not been present when the massacre occurred, but his account was compiled from detailed conversations with soldiers of Charlie Company who had witnessed and, in some cases, participated in the killing. He became convinced that something "rather dark and bloody did indeed occur" at Mỹ Lai, and was so disturbed by the tales he heard that within three months of being discharged from the Army he penned his concerns to Congress as well as the Chairman of the Joint Chiefs of Staff, and the President. He included the name of Michael Bernhardt, an eyewitness who agreed to testify, in the letter.

Most recipients of Ridenhour's letter ignored it, with the exception of Congressman Mo Udall and Senators Barry Goldwater and Edward Brooke. Udall urged the House Armed Services Committee to call on Pentagon officials to conduct an investigation.

== Public revelation and consequences ==
Under mounting pressure caused by Ridenhour's letter, on 9 September 1969, the Army quietly charged Calley with six specifications of premeditated murder for the deaths of 109 South Vietnamese civilians near the village of Sơn Mỹ, at a hamlet called simply "My Lai". Calley's court martial was not released to the press and did not commence until November 1970. However, word of Calley's prosecution found its way to American investigative reporter and freelance journalist Seymour Hersh.

My Lai was first revealed to the public on 13 November 1969—more than a year and a half after the incident—when Hersh published a story through the Dispatch News Service. After extensive interviews with Calley, Hersh broke the Mỹ Lai story in 35 newspapers; additionally, the Alabama Journal in Montgomery and the New York Times ran separate stories on the allegations against Calley on 12 and 13 November, respectively. On 20 November, explicit color photographs and eye-witness testimony of the massacre taken by U.S. Army combat photographer Ronald L. Haeberle were published in The Cleveland Plain Dealer. The same day, Time, Life and Newsweek all covered the story, and CBS televised an interview with Paul Meadlo, a soldier in Calley's unit during the massacre. From the U.S. Government and Army's point of view, Haeberle's photos transformed the massacre from potentially manageable to a very serious problem. The day after their publication, Melvin Laird the Secretary of Defense discussed them with Henry Kissinger who was at the time National Security Advisor to President Richard Nixon. Laird was recorded as saying that while he would like "to sweep it under the rug", the photographs prevented it. "They're pretty terrible", he said. "There are so many kids just laying there; these pictures are authentic". Within the Army, the reaction was similar. Chief Warrant Officer André Feher, with the CID, was assigned the case in early August 1969. After he interviewed Haeberle, and was shown the photographs which he described as "evidence that something real bad had happened", he and the Pentagon officials he reported to realized "that news of the massacre could not be contained".

The story threatened to undermine the U.S. war effort and severely damage the Nixon presidency. Inside the White House, officials privately discussed how to contain the scandal. On 21 November, Kissinger emphasized that the White House needed to develop a "game plan", to establish a "press policy", and maintain a "unified line" in its public response. The White House established a "My Lai Task Force" whose mission was to "figure out how best to control the problem", to make sure administration officials "all don't go in different directions" when discussing the incident, and to "engage in dirty tricks". These included discrediting key witnesses and questioning Hersh's motives for releasing the story. What soon followed was a public relations offensive by the administration designed to shape how My Lai would be portrayed in the press and understood among the American public.

As members of Congress called for an inquiry and news correspondents abroad expressed their horror at the massacre, the General Counsel of the Army Robert Jordan was tasked with speaking to the press. He refused to confirm allegations against Calley. Noting the significance that the statement was given at all, Bill Downs of ABC News said it amounted to the first public expression of concern by a "high defense official" that American troops "might have committed genocide".

On 24 November 1969, Lieutenant General William R. Peers was appointed by the Secretary of the Army and the Army Chief of Staff to conduct a thorough review of the My Lai incident, 16–19 March 1968, and its investigation by the Army. Peers's final report, presented to higher-ups on 17 March 1970, was highly critical of top officers at brigade and divisional levels for participating in the cover-up, and the Charlie Company officers for their actions at Mỹ Lai.

According to Peers' findings:

[The 1st Battalion] members had killed at least 175–200 Vietnamese men, women, and children. The evidence indicates that only 3 or 4 were confirmed as Viet Cong although there were undoubtedly several unarmed VC (men, women, and children) among them and many more active supporters and sympathizers. One man from the company was reported as wounded from the accidental discharge of his weapon. ... a tragedy of major proportions had occurred at Son My.

In 2003 Hugh Thompson, the pilot who had intervened during the massacre, said of the Peers report:

The Army had Lieutenant General William R. Peers conduct the investigation. He conducted a very thorough investigation. Congress did not like his investigation at all, because he pulled no punches, and he recommended court-martial for I think 34 people, not necessarily for the murder but for the cover-up. Really the cover-up phase was probably as bad as the massacre itself, because he recommended court-martial for some very high-ranking individuals.

In July 1969, the Office of Provost Marshal General of the Army began to examine the evidence regarding possible criminal charges. Eventually, Calley was charged with several counts of premeditated murder in September 1969, and 25 other officers and enlisted men were later charged with related crimes.

In April 1972, Congressman Les Aspin sued the Department of Defense in District Court to reveal the Peers Commission. Following the massacre a Pentagon task force called the Vietnam War Crimes Working Group (VWCWG) investigated alleged atrocities which were committed against South Vietnamese civilians by U.S. troops and created a secret archive of some 9,000 pages which documents 320 alleged incidents from 1967 to 1971 including seven massacres in which at least 137 civilians died; 78 additional attacks targeting noncombatants in which at least 57 were killed, 56 were wounded and 15 were sexually assaulted; and 141 incidents of U.S. soldiers torturing civilian detainees or prisoners of war. 203 U.S. personnel were charged with crimes, 57 of them were court-martialed and 23 of them were convicted. The VWCWG also investigated over 500 additional alleged atrocities but it could not verify them.

=== Court martial ===
On 17 November 1970, a court-martial in the United States charged 14 officers, including Major General Koster, the Americal Division's commanding officer, with suppressing information related to the incident. Most of the charges were later dropped. Brigade commander Colonel Henderson was the only high ranking commanding officer who stood trial on charges relating to the cover-up of the Mỹ Lai massacre; he was acquitted on 17 December 1971.

During the four-month-long trial, Calley consistently claimed that he was following orders from his commanding officer, Medina. Despite that, he was convicted and sentenced to life in prison on 29 March 1971, after being found guilty of premeditated murder of not fewer than 20 people. Two days later, Nixon made the controversial decision to have Calley released from armed custody at Fort Benning, Georgia, and put under house arrest pending appeal of his sentence. Calley's conviction was upheld by the Army Court of Military Review in 1973 and by the U.S. Court of Military Appeals in 1974.

In August 1971, Calley's sentence was reduced by the convening authority from life to twenty years. Calley would eventually serve three-and-a-half years under house arrest at Fort Benning including three months in the disciplinary barracks at Fort Leavenworth, Kansas. In September 1974, he was paroled by the Secretary of the Army, Howard Callaway.

In a separate trial, Medina denied giving the orders that led to the massacre, and was acquitted of all charges, effectively negating the prosecution's theory of "command responsibility", now referred to as the "Medina standard". Several months after his acquittal, however, Medina admitted he had suppressed evidence and had lied to Henderson about the number of civilian deaths.

Captain Kotouc, an intelligence officer from 11th Brigade, was also court-martialed and found not guilty. Koster was demoted to brigadier general and lost his position as the Superintendent of West Point. His deputy, Brigadier General Young, received a letter of censure. Both were stripped of Distinguished Service Medals which had been awarded for service in Vietnam.

Of the 26 men initially charged, Calley was the only one convicted. Some have argued that the outcome of the Mỹ Lai courts-martial failed to uphold the laws of war established in the Nuremberg and Tokyo War Crimes Tribunals.

=== Classification as a war crime ===
Telford Taylor, a senior American prosecutor at Nuremberg, wrote that legal principles established at the war crimes trials could have been used to prosecute senior American military commanders for failing to prevent atrocities such as the one at Mỹ Lai.

Howard Callaway, Secretary of the Army, was quoted in The New York Times in 1976 as stating that Calley's sentence was reduced because Calley honestly believed that what he did was a part of his orders—a rationale that contradicts the standards set at Nuremberg and Tokyo, where following orders was not a defense for committing war crimes. On the whole, aside from the Mỹ Lai courts-martial, there were 36 military trials held by the U.S. Army from January 1965 to August 1973 for crimes against civilians in Vietnam.

== Causes ==
American behavior during the My Lai Massacre reflected a culture of casual murder, widespread racial contempt for the local Vietnamese in the US military, and the policies of American commanders who routinely covered up atrocities by the rank and file.

Many American units and their commanders dehumanized Vietnamese people, a habit that was reinforced as early as basic training. Drill instructors would not refer to the Vietnamese as "Vietnamese", but rather as dinks, gooks, slopes, slants, rice-eaters, and animals.

Service in Vietnam reinforced these attitudes, with American troops instructed to distrust all Vietnamese. According to one veteran, "enemy is anything with slant eyes who lives in the village. It doesn't make any difference if it's a woman or child". Another officer stated, "So a few women and children get killed. Teach 'em a damn good lesson. They're all VC or at least helping them. You can't convert them, only kill them". Thus, American units often shared racial contempt or hatred for all local Vietnamese, regardless of affiliation, age or status.

American atrocities were enabled by a culture of top-down tolerance, as demonstrated by widespread solidarity with the perpetrators of My Lai. For example, when Captain Medina was acquitted, the judge wished him a happy birthday. In the aftermath of Calley's conviction, the White House received 5,000 telegrams expressing support for the lieutenant, while American soldiers vandalized buildings in Saigon with messages of "KILL A GOOK FOR CALLEY". President Nixon, in response to the American press headlining My Lai, exclaimed to a White House aide that "It's those dirty rotten Jews from New York who are behind it".

Some authors have argued that the light punishments of low-level personnel present at Mỹ Lai and unwillingness to hold higher officials responsible was part of a pattern in which the body-count strategy and the so-called "Mere Gook Rule" encouraged U.S. soldiers to err on the side of killing suspected Vietnamese enemies, even if there was a very good chance that they were civilians. This in turn, Nick Turse argues, made lesser known massacres similar to Mỹ Lai and a pattern of war crimes common in Vietnam.

== Wider patterns ==
The My Lai Massacre was not an isolated incident. Citing Ronald Ridenhour, Nick Turse described the atrocities at My Lai as "an operation, not an aberration". He writes further that many similar war crimes occurred in Vietnam that were borne from deliberate policies, atrocities that were not photographed or documented. Investigations were often abandoned or quashed by higher authorities, while whistleblowers were often threatened or smeared to suppress their testimonies. The inquiries into My Lai produced evidence of other war crimes committed at the same time by Bravo Company of the 4/3rd Infantry, which resulted in no convictions. Turse argues My Lai and other atrocities follow similar patterns in seeking to maximize enemy "body counts" and the creation of "free-fire zones". In addition, American troops routinely burned entire villages in the Vietnamese countryside, from reasons ranging for revenge for a nearby booby trap to venting rage against any Vietnamese they could find.

Nick Turse gives the example of Operation Speedy Express, where the US 9th Division, commanded by General Julian Ewell, killed thousands of Vietnamese civilians in the Mekong Delta between December 1968 and May 1969. The 9th Division reported an official enemy body count of 10,899 killed during Speedy Express. A 1972 Inspector General report concluded that "that civilian casualties may have amounted to several thousand (between 5,000 and 7,000)." In May 1970, a sergeant who participated in Operation Speedy Express wrote a confidential letter to then Army Chief of Staff Westmoreland describing civilian killings he said were on the scale of the massacre occurring as "a My Lai each month for over a year" during 1968–69. Two other letters to this effect from enlisted soldiers to military leaders in 1971, all signed "Concerned Sergeant", were uncovered within declassified National Archive documents. The letters describe common occurrences of civilian killings during population pacification operations. Army policy also stressed very high body counts and this resulted in dead civilians being marked down as combatants. Alluding to indiscriminate killings described as unavoidable, the commander of the 9th Infantry Division, then Major General Julian Ewell, in September 1969, submitted a confidential report to Westmoreland and other generals describing the countryside in some areas of Vietnam as resembling the battlefields of Verdun.

In 1968, American journalist, Jonathan Schell, reported that in Quang Ngai province, where the My Lai massacre occurred, up to 70% of all villages were destroyed by the air strikes and artillery bombardments, including the use of napalm; 40 percent of the population were refugees, and the overall civilian casualties were close to 50,000 a year. Regarding the massacre at Mỹ Lai, he stated, "There can be no doubt that such an atrocity was possible only because a number of other methods of killing civilians and destroying their villages had come to be the rule, and not the exception, in our conduct of the war".

== Survivors ==
In early 1972, the camp at Mỹ Lai (2) where the survivors of the Mỹ Lai massacre had been relocated was largely destroyed by Army of the Republic of Vietnam (ARVN) artillery and aerial bombardment, and remaining eyewitnesses were dispersed. The destruction was officially attributed to "Viet Cong terrorists". Quaker service workers in the area gave testimony in May 1972 by Martin Teitel at hearings before the Congressional Subcommittee to Investigate Problems Connected with Refugees and Escapees in South Vietnam. In June 1972, Teitel's account was published in The New York Times.

Many American soldiers who had been in Mỹ Lai during the massacre accepted personal responsibility for the loss of civilian lives. Some of them expressed regrets without acknowledging any personal guilt, as, for example, Medina, who said, "I have regrets for it, but I have no guilt over it because I didn't cause it. That's not what the military, particularly the United States Army, is trained for."

Lawrence La Croix, a squad leader in Charlie Company, stated in 2010: "A lot of people talk about My Lai, and they say, 'Well, you know, yeah, but you can't follow an illegal order.' Trust me. There is no such thing. Not in the military. If I go into a combat situation and I tell them, 'No, I'm not going. I'm not going to do that. I'm not going to follow that order', well, they'd put me up against the wall and shoot me."

On 16 March 1998, a gathering of local people and former American and Vietnamese soldiers stood together at the place of the Mỹ Lai massacre in Vietnam to commemorate its 30th anniversary. American veterans Hugh Thompson and Lawrence Colburn, who were shielding civilians during the massacre, addressed the crowd. Among the listeners was Phan Thi Nhanh, a 14-year-old girl at the time of the massacre. She was saved by Thompson and vividly remembered that tragic day, "We don't say we forget. We just try not to think about the past, but in our hearts we keep a place to think about that". Colburn challenged Calley "to face the women we faced today who asked the questions they asked, and look at the tears in their eyes and tell them why it happened". No American diplomats or any other officials attended the meeting.

More than a thousand people turned out on 16 March 2008, forty years after the massacre. The Sơn Mỹ Memorial drew survivors and families of victims and some returning U.S. veterans. One woman (an eight-year-old at the time) said, "Everyone in my family was killed in the Mỹ Lai massacre—my mother, my father, my brother and three sisters. They threw me into a ditch full of dead bodies. I was covered with blood and brains." The U.S. was unofficially represented by a volunteer group from Wisconsin called Madison Quakers, who in 10 years built three schools in Mỹ Lai and planted a peace garden.

On 19 August 2009, Calley made his only public apology for the massacre in a speech to the Kiwanis club of Greater Columbus, Georgia:

"There is not a day that goes by that I do not feel remorse for what happened that day in My Lai", he told members of the club. "I feel remorse for the Vietnamese who were killed, for their families, for the American soldiers involved and their families. I am very sorry. ... If you are asking why I did not stand up to them when I was given the orders, I will have to say that I was a 2nd lieutenant getting orders from my commander and I followed them—foolishly, I guess."

Trần Văn Đức, who was seven years old at the time of the Mỹ Lai massacre and now resides in Remscheid, Germany, called the apology "terse". He wrote a public letter to Calley describing the plight of his and many other families to remind him that time did not ease the pain, and that grief and sorrow over lost lives will forever stay in Mỹ Lai.

== Participants ==
=== Officers ===
- LTC Frank A. Barker – commander of the Task Force Barker, a battalion-sized unit, assembled to attack the VC 48th Battalion supposedly based in and around Mỹ Lai. He allegedly ordered the destruction of the village and supervised the artillery barrage and combat assault from his helicopter. Reported the operation as a success; was killed in Vietnam on 13 June 1968, in a mid-air collision before the investigation had begun.
- CPT Kenneth W. Boatman – an artillery forward observer; was accused by the Army of failure to report possible misconduct, but the charge was dropped.
- MAJ Charles C. Calhoun – operations officer of Task Force Barker; charges against him of failure to report possible misconduct were dropped.
- 2LT William Calley – platoon leader, 1st Platoon, Charlie Company, 1st Battalion, 20th Infantry Regiment, 11th Infantry Brigade, 23rd Infantry Division. Was charged in premeditating the murder of 102 civilians, found guilty and sentenced to life. Was paroled in September 1974 by the Secretary of the Army Howard Callaway. Died on 28 April 2024.
- LTC William D. Guinn Jr. – Deputy Province Senior Advisor/Senior Sector Advisor for Quang Ngai province. Charges against him of dereliction of duty and false swearing brought by the Army were dropped.
- COL Oran K. Henderson – 11th Infantry Brigade commander, who ordered the attack and flew in a helicopter over Mỹ Lai during it. After Hugh Thompson immediately reported multiple killings of civilians, Henderson started the cover-up by dismissing the allegation about the massacre and reporting to his superiors that indeed 20 people from Mỹ Lai died by accident. Accused of cover-up and perjury by the Army; charges dropped. Died on 2 June 1998.
- MG Samuel W. Koster – commander of the 23rd Infantry Division, was not involved with planning the Mỹ Lai search-and-destroy mission. However, during the operation he flew over Mỹ Lai and monitored the radio communications. Afterward, Koster did not follow up with the 11th Brigade commander COL Henderson on the initial investigation, and later was involved in the cover-up. Was charged by the Army with failure to obey lawful regulations, dereliction of duty, and alleged cover-up; charges dropped. Later was demoted to brigadier general and stripped of a Distinguished Service Medal. He died on 23 January 2006.
- CPT Eugene M. Kotouc – military intelligence officer assigned to Task Force Barker; he partially provided information, on which the Mỹ Lai combat assault was approved; together with Medina and a South Vietnamese officer, he interrogated, tortured and allegedly executed VC and NVA suspects later that day. Was charged with maiming and assault, tried by the jury and acquitted. Died on 23 September 2008.
- CPT Dennis H. Johnson – 52d Military Intelligence Detachment, assigned to Task Force Barker, was accused of failure to obey lawful regulations; however, charges were later dropped.
- 2LT Jeffrey U. Lacross – platoon leader, 3rd Platoon, Charlie Company; testified that his platoon did not meet any armed resistance in Mỹ Lai, and that his men did not kill anybody; however, since, in his words, both Calley and Brooks reported a body count of 60 for their platoons, he then submitted a body count of 6. Died on 14 March 2020.
- MAJ Robert W. McKnight – operations officer of the 11th Brigade; was accused of false swearing by the Army, but charges were subsequently dropped.
- CPT Ernest Medina – commander of Charlie Company, 1st Battalion, 20th Infantry; nicknamed Mad Dog by subordinates. He planned, ordered, and supervised the execution of the operation in Sơn Mỹ village. Was accused of failure to report a felony and of murder; went to trial and was acquitted. He died on 8 May 2018.
- CPT Earl Michles – officer during My Lai operation; he died in a helicopter crash three months later.
- Col Nels A Parson – charged with failure to obey lawful regulations and dereliction in the performance of their duties; but charges were subsequently dropped. Died on 19 May 2013.
- BG George H. Young Jr. – assistant division commander, 23rd Infantry Division; charged with alleged cover-up, failure to obey lawful regulations and dereliction of duty by the Army; charges were dismissed. Died on 23 October 1996.
- MAJ Frederic W. Watke – commander of Company B, 123rd Aviation Battalion, 23rd Infantry Division, providing helicopter support on 16 March 1968. Testified that he informed COL Henderson about killings of civilians in My Lai as reported by helicopter pilots. Accused of failure to obey lawful regulations and dereliction of duty; charges dropped.
- CPT Thomas K. Willingham – Company B, 4th Battalion, 3rd Infantry Regiment, assigned to Task Force Barker; charged with making false official statements and failure to report a felony; charges dropped.

Altogether, 14 officers directly and indirectly involved with the operation, including two generals, were investigated in connection with the Mỹ Lai massacre, except for LTC Frank A. Barker, CPT Earl Michaels, and 2LT Stephen Brooks, who all died before the beginning of the investigation.

=== 1st Platoon, Charlie Company, 1st Battalion, 20th Infantry ===
- PFC James Bergthold, Sr. – Assistant gunner and ammo bearer on a machine gun team with Maples. Was never charged with a crime. Admitted that he killed a wounded woman he came upon in a hut, to put her out of her misery.
- PFC Michael Bernhardt – Rifleman; he dropped out of the University of Miami to volunteer for the Army. Bernhardt refused to kill civilians at Mỹ Lai. Captain Medina reportedly later threatened Bernhardt to deter him from exposing the massacre. As a result, Bernhardt was given more dangerous assignments such as point duty on patrol and would later be afflicted with a form of trench foot as a direct result. Bernhardt told Ridenhour, who was not present at Mỹ Lai during the massacre, about the events, pushing him to continue his investigation. Later he would help expose and detail the massacre in numerous interviews with the press, and he served as a prosecution witness in the trial of Medina, where he was subjected to intense cross examination by defense counsel F. Lee Bailey backed by a team of attorneys including Gary Myers. Bernhardt is a recipient of the New York Society for Ethical Culture's 1970 Ethical Humanist Award.
- PFC Herbert L. Carter – "tunnel rat"; shot himself in the foot while reloading his pistol and claimed that he shot himself in the foot to be MEDEVACed out of the village when the massacre started.
- PFC Dennis L. Conti – Grenadier/Minesweeper; testified that he initially refused to shoot but later fired some M79 rounds at a group of fleeing people with unknown effect.
- SP4 Lawrence C. La Croix – Squad Leader; testified favorably for Captain Medina during his trial. In 1993, he sent a letter to the Los Angeles Times, saying, "Now, 25 years later, I have only recently stopped having flashbacks of that morning. I still cannot touch a weapon without vomiting. I am unable to interact with any of the large Vietnamese population in Los Angeles for fear that they might find out who I am; and, because I cannot stand the pain of remembering or wondering if maybe they had relatives or loved ones who were victims at Mỹ Lai ... some of us will walk in the jungles and hear the cries of anguish for all eternity".
- PFC James Joseph Dursi – Rifleman; followed orders to round up civilians, but refused to open fire, even when ordered to do so by Lieutenant Calley. Earlier that day, he had shot a fleeing villager who was apparently carrying a weapon but turned out to be a woman carrying her baby. Afterwards, Dursi had vowed to not kill again.
- PFC Ronald Grzesik – a team leader. He claimed he followed orders to round up civilians but refused to kill them.
- SP4 Robert E. Maples – Machine gunner attached to SSG Bacon's squad; stated that he refused an order to kill civilians hiding in a ditch and claimed his commanding officer threatened to shoot him.
- PFC Paul D. Meadlo – Rifleman; said he was afraid of being shot if he did not participate. Lost his foot to a land mine the next day; later, he publicly admitted his part in the massacre.
- SSG David Mitchell – Squad Leader; accused by witnesses of shooting people at the ditch site; pleaded not guilty. Mitchell was acquitted.
- SP4 Charles Sledge – Radiotelephone Operator; later a prosecution witness.
- PV2 Harry Stanley – Grenadier; claimed to have refused an order from Lieutenant Calley to kill civilians that were rounded-up in a bomb-crater but refused to testify against Calley. After he was featured in a documentary and several newspapers, the city of Berkeley, California, designated 17 October as "Harry Stanley Day".
- SGT Esequiel Torres – previously had tortured and hanged an old man because Torres found his bandaged leg suspicious. He and Roschevitz (described below) were involved in the shooting of a group of ten women and five children in a hut. Calley ordered Torres to man the machine gun and open fire on the villagers that had been grouped together. Before everyone in the group was down, Torres ceased fire and refused to fire again. Calley took over the M60 and finished shooting the remaining villagers in that group himself. Torres was charged with murder but acquitted. Died 26 June 2015.
- SP4 Frederick J. Widmer – Assistant Radiotelephone Operator; Widmer, who has been the subject of pointed blame, is quoted as saying, "The most disturbing thing I saw was one boy—and this was something that, you know, this is what haunts me from the whole, the whole ordeal down there. And there was a boy with his arm shot off, shot up half, half hanging on and he just had this bewildered look in his face and like, 'What did I do, what's wrong?' He was just, you know, it's, it's hard to describe, couldn't comprehend. I, I shot the boy, killed him and it's—I'd like to think of it more or less as a mercy killing because somebody else would have killed him in the end, but it wasn't right." Widmer died on 11 August 2016, aged 68.

Before being shipped to South Vietnam, all of Charlie Company's soldiers went through an advanced infantry training and basic unit training at Pohakuloa Training Area in Hawaii. At Schofield Barracks they were taught how to treat POWs and how to distinguish VC guerrillas from civilians by a Judge Advocate.

=== Other soldiers ===
- Nicholas Capezza – Chief Medic; HHQ Company; insisted he saw nothing unusual.
- William Doherty and Michael Terry – 3rd Platoon soldiers who participated in the killing of the wounded in a ditch.
- SGT Ronald L. Haeberle – Photographer; Information Office, 11th Brigade; was attached to Charlie Company. Haeberle carried two Army issued black and white cameras for official photos and his own personal camera containing color slide film. He submitted the black and white photos as part of the report on the operation to brigade authorities. By his own testimony at the Courts Martial, he admitted that official photographs generally did not include soldiers committing the killings and generally avoided identifying the individual perpetrators, while his personal color camera contained a few images of soldiers killing elderly men, women of various ages and children. Haeberle also testified that he destroyed most of the color slides which incriminated individual soldiers on the basis that he believed it was unfair to place the blame only on these individuals when many more were equally guilty. He gave his color images to his hometown newspaper, The Plain Dealer, and then sold them to Life magazine. Criticism was initially levelled at Haeberle for not reporting what he witnessed or turning in his color photographs to the Army. He responded that "he had never considered" turning in his personal color photos and explained, "If a general is smiling wrong in a photograph, I have learned to destroy it. ... My experience as a G.I. over there is that if something doesn't look right, a general smiling the wrong way ... I stopped and destroyed the negative." He felt his photographs would never have seen the light of day if he had turned them in. It was confirmed in the U.S. Army's own investigation that Haeberle had, in fact, been reprimanded for taking pictures which "were detrimental to the United States Army".
- Sergeant Minh, Duong – ARVN interpreter, 52nd Military intelligence Detachment, attached to Task Force Barker; confronted Captain Medina about the number of civilians that were killed. Medina reportedly replied, "Sergeant Minh, don't ask anything – those were the orders."
- SGT Gary D. Roschevitz – Grenadier; 2nd platoon; according to the testimony of James M. McBreen, Roschevitz killed five or six people standing together with a canister shot from his M79 grenade launcher, which had a shotgun effect after exploding; also grabbed an M16 rifle from Varnado Simpson to kill five Vietnamese prisoners. According to various witnesses, he later forced several women to undress with the intention of raping them. When the women refused, he reportedly shot at them. Died 12 August 2020.
- PFC Varnado Simpson – Rifleman; 2nd Platoon; admitted that he slew around 10 people in My Lai on CPT Medina's orders to kill not only people, but even cats and dogs. He fired at a group of people where he allegedly saw a man with a weapon, but instead killed a woman with a baby. He committed suicide on 4 May 1997, after repeatedly acknowledging remorse for several murders in Mỹ Lai.
- SGT Kenneth Hodges, squad leader, was charged with rape and murder during the My Lai Massacre. In every interview given he strictly claimed that he was following orders.

=== Rescue helicopter crew ===
- WO1 Hugh Thompson Jr.
- SP4 Glenn Andreotta
- SP4 Lawrence Colburn

== Media coverage ==
A photographer and a reporter from the 11th Brigade Information Office were attached to Task Force Barker and landed with Charlie Company in Sơn Mỹ on 16 March 1968. Neither the Americal News Sheet published 17 March 1968, nor the Trident, 11th Infantry Brigade newsletter from 22 March 1968, reported the deaths of noncombatants in Mỹ Lai. Stars and Stripes published a laudatory piece, "U.S. troops Surrounds Red, Kill 128", on 18 March.

On 12 April 1968, the Trident wrote, "The most punishing operations undertaken by the brigade in Operation Muscatine's area involved three separate raids into the village and vicinity of My Lai, which cost the VC 276 killed". On 4 April 1968, the information office of the 11th Brigade issued a press-release, Recent Operations in Pinkville, without reporting mass casualties among civilians. Subsequent criminal investigation found that "Both individuals failed to report what they had seen, the reporter wrote a false and misleading account of the operation, and the photographer withheld and suppressed from proper authorities the photographic evidence of atrocities he had obtained."

Vietnam was an atrocity from the get-go... There were hundreds of My Lais. You got your card punched by the numbers of bodies you counted.

— David H. Hackworth

The first reporting of the Mỹ Lai massacre appeared in the American media after Fort Benning issued a press release related to the charges pressed against Calley. This was issued on 5 September 1969.

Consequently, NBC aired on 10 September 1969 a segment in the Huntley-Brinkley Report which reported the killings of numerous civilians in South Vietnam. Following that, Ridenhour decided to disobey the Army's order to withhold the information from the media. He approached reporter Ben Cole of the Phoenix Republic, who chose not to handle the scoop. Charles Black from the Columbus Enquirer uncovered the story on his own but also decided to put it on hold. Two major national news press outlets—The New York Times and The Washington Post—received some tips with partial information but did not act on them.

External image
- Front page of The Plain Dealer scoop on the Mỹ Lai massacre, 20 November 1969

Ridenhour called Seymour Hersh on 22 October 1969. The freelance investigative journalist conducted an independent inquiry, and published to break the wall of silence that was surrounding the Mỹ Lai massacre. Hersh initially tried to sell the story to Life and Look magazines; both turned it down. Hersh went to the small, Washington-based Dispatch News Service, which sent it to fifty major American newspapers; thirty accepted it for publication. New York Times reporter Henry Kamm investigated further and found several survivors of the Mỹ Lai massacre in South Vietnam. He estimated the number of civilians killed as 567.

Next, Ben Cole published an article about Ronald Ridenhour, a helicopter gunner and an Army whistleblower, who was among the first who started to uncover the truth about the Mỹ Lai massacre. Haeberle contacted Joseph Eszterhas of The Plain Dealer, which then published Haeberle's grisly images of the dead bodies of old men, women, and children on 20 November 1969. Time Magazine's article on 28 November 1969 and in Life magazine on 5 December 1969, both of which included Haeberle's photos, finally brought Mỹ Lai to the fore of the public debate about Vietnam War.

Richard L. Strout, the Christian Science Monitor political commentator, wrote: "American press self-censorship thwarted Mr. Ridenhour's disclosures for a year. 'No one wanted to go into it', his agent said of telegrams sent to Life, Look, and Newsweek magazines outlining allegations."

Afterward, interviews and stories connected to the Mỹ Lai massacre started to appear regularly in the American and international press.

Concluding an ABC television news broadcast, anchorman Frank Reynolds said to his audience that, as a consequence of the allegations, "our spirit as a people is scarred". The massacre, he believed, offered "the most compelling argument yet advanced for America to end its involvement in Vietnam, not alone because of what the war is doing to the Vietnamese or to our reputation abroad, but because of what it is doing to us".

== Cultural representations ==
=== Music ===
- Over 100 songs were released about the My Lai Massacre and Lt. William Calley, identified by the Vietnam War Song Project. During the war years (from 1969 to 1973), pro-Calley songs outnumbered anti-Calley songs 2–1, according to the research collected by Justin Brummer, the founding editor of the Vietnam War Song Project. All the songs in the post-war era were critical of the actions of Calley and his platoon. Commercially, the most successful song was "The Battle Hymn of Lt. Calley" by Terry Nelson, which peaked at No. 37 in the Billboard Hot 100 on 1 May 1971, selling over 1 million records. Despite its success, Tex Ritter cancelled his cover of the song because his record label, Capitol, viewed it as controversial. John Deer's cover of the song bubbled under the Billboard Hot 100 on 1 May 1971, at No. 114.
- In 1971 American composer Arnold Rosner wrote an extended symphonic work entitled A My Lai Elegy. It received its premiere by the Colorado Symphony under the direction of Carl Topilow in 1974. The work was recorded by Toccata Classics in 2024, in a performance by the London Philharmonic Orchestra under the direction of Nick Palmer.
- In 2016, Mỹ Lai, an operatic account about the massacre was created by composer Jonathan Berger and libretto by Harriet Scott Chessman and performed by the Kronos Quartet, along with tenor Rinde Eckert and đàn tranh instrumentalist Vân-Ánh Vanessa Võ; centering on the experiences of the helicopter pilot Hugh Thompson's intervention in stopping further bloodshed on the civilians. The opera made its world premiere at the Harris Theater in Chicago on 29 January 2016 and received wide critical acclaim. The album recording was released on 16 March 2022 on the 54th anniversary of the massacre, including the fiftieth anniversary founding of the Kronos Quartet.

=== On television, film and video ===
- In the third season of Hawaii Five-O, the episode "To Kill or Be Killed", aired on 13 January 1971, has a highly decorated army officer relate events alluding to the massacre just prior to committing suicide.
- The 1971 documentary short Interviews with My Lai Veterans won the Academy Award for Best Documentary, Short Subjects. In it, five American soldiers discussed their participation in the massacres.
- In 1971, CBS 60 Minutes correspondent Morley Safer visits the village for a segment "My Lai Revisited" broadcast on 13 April 1971.
- In 1975, Stanley Kramer and Lee Bernhard directed a docudrama, Judgment: The Court Martial of Lieutenant William Calley, with Tony Musante as Lieutenant Calley, and Harrison Ford as Frank Crowder.
- On 2 May 1989, the British television station Yorkshire Television broadcast the documentary Four Hours in My Lai, directed by Kevin Sim, as part of the networked series First Tuesday. Using eyewitness statements from both Vietnamese and Americans, the programme revealed new evidence about the massacre. The program was subsequently aired by PBS in the United States on 23 May as Remember My Lai (Frontline, Season 7).
- In 1994, a video film My Lai Revisited was aired on 60 Minutes by CBS.
- Photography of the massacre is shown on screen and discussed in a philosophical context in Abel Ferrara's 1995 horror film The Addiction.
- On 15 March 2008, the BBC broadcast the documentary The My Lai Tapes on Radio 4 and subsequently on the BBC World Service, in both English and Vietnamese, that used never-before-heard audio recordings of testimony taken at The Pentagon during the 1969–70 Peers's Inquiry.
- On 26 April 2010, the American PBS broadcast a documentary as part of its American Experience series, entitled The American Experience: My Lai.
- On 10 December 2010, Italian producer Gianni Paolucci released a movie entitled My Lai Four, directed by Paolo Bertola, starring American actor Beau Ballinger as Calley, and adapted from the Pulitzer Prize–winning book by Seymour Hersh.
- Episode 8 of Ken Burns' 2017 documentary series The Vietnam War relates to these events.
- In 2018, My Lai Inside, a documentary by Christoph Felder was released
- In 2025, director and YouTuber Hoang Nam announced a film project based on the My Lai incident titled "The My Lai Baby" (Vietnamese: Em Bé Mỹ Lai).
- The My Lai massacre (and the cover-up thereof) is discussed in the 2025 documentary Cover-Up.

=== In theater ===
The Lieutenant is a 1975 Broadway rock opera that concerns the Mỹ Lai massacre and resulting courts martial. It was nominated for four Tony Awards including Best Musical and Best Book of a Musical.

=== Photography ===
The Mỹ Lai massacre, like many other events in Vietnam, was captured on camera by U.S. Army personnel. The most published and graphic images were taken by Haeberle, a U.S. Army Public Information Detachment photographer who accompanied the men of Charlie Company that day.

In 2009, Haeberle said that he destroyed a number of photographs he took during the massacre. Unlike the photographs of the dead bodies, the destroyed photographs depicted Americans in the actual process of murdering Vietnamese civilians. According to M. Paul Holsinger, the And babies poster, which used a Haeberle photo, was "easily the most successful poster to vent the outrage that so many felt about the human cost of the conflict in Southeast Asia. Copies are still frequently seen in retrospectives dealing with the popular culture of the Vietnam War era or in collections of art from the period."

Another soldier, John Henry Smail of the 3rd Platoon, took at least 16 color photographs depicting U.S. Army personnel, helicopters, and aerial views of Mỹ Lai. These, along with Haeberle's photographs, were included in the "Report of the Department of the Army review of the Preliminary Investigations into the My Lai Incident". Former First Lieutenant (1LT) Roger L. Alaux Jr., a forward artillery observer, who was assigned to Charlie Company during the combat assault on Mỹ Lai 4, also took some photographs from a helicopter that day, including aerial views of Mỹ Lai, and of the Charlie Company's landing zone.

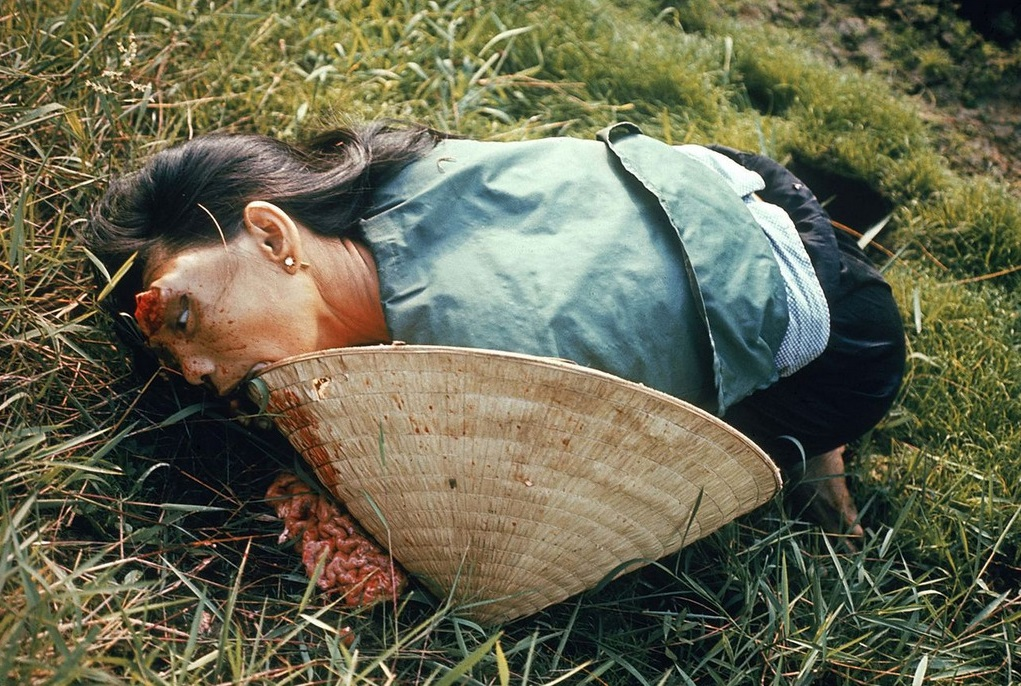
Mrs. Nguyễn Thị Tẩu (chín Tẩu), killed by U.S. soldiers

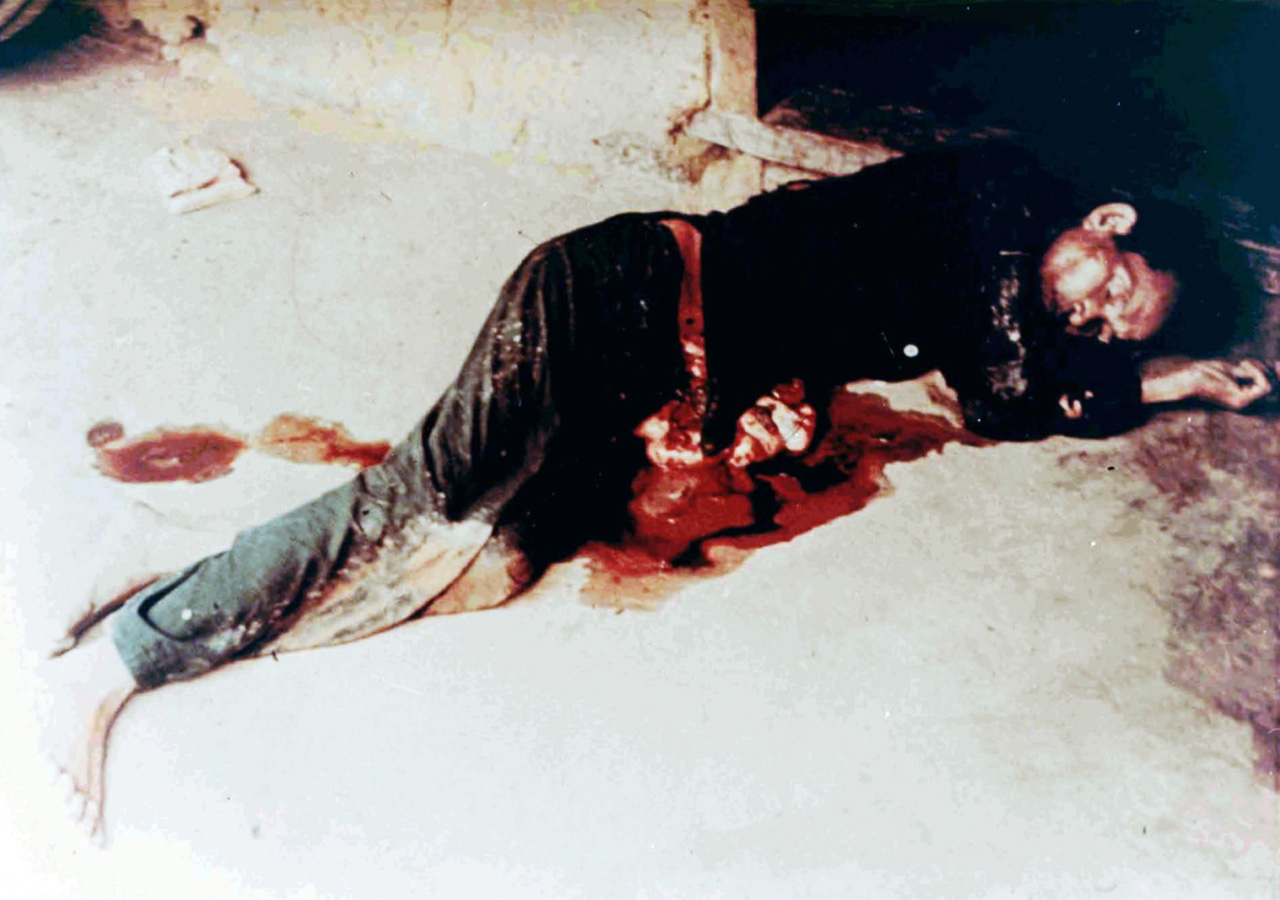
Unidentified dead Vietnamese man

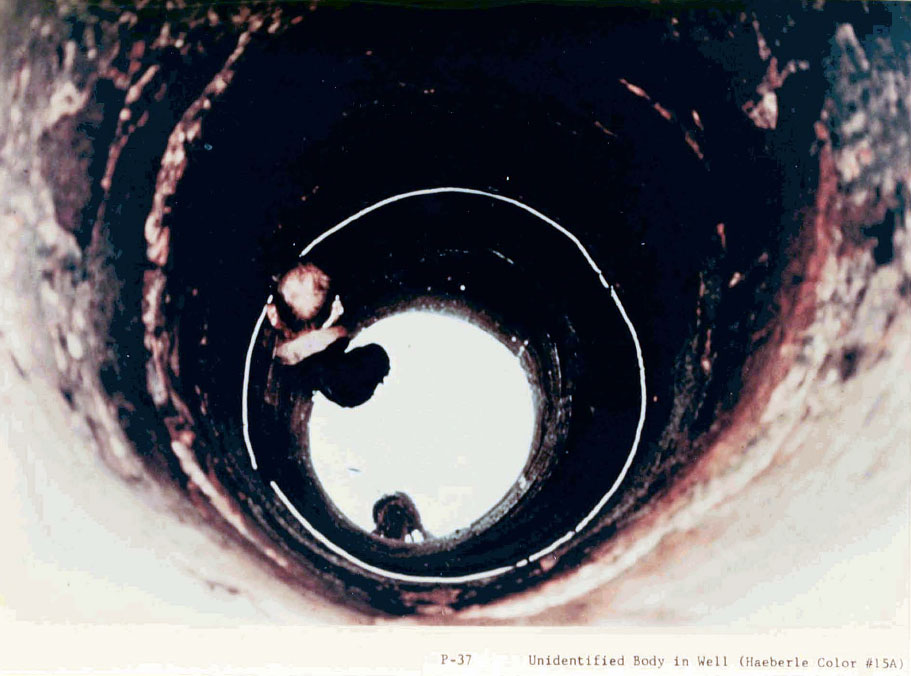
The corpse of Mr. Truong Tho (72) thrown down a well

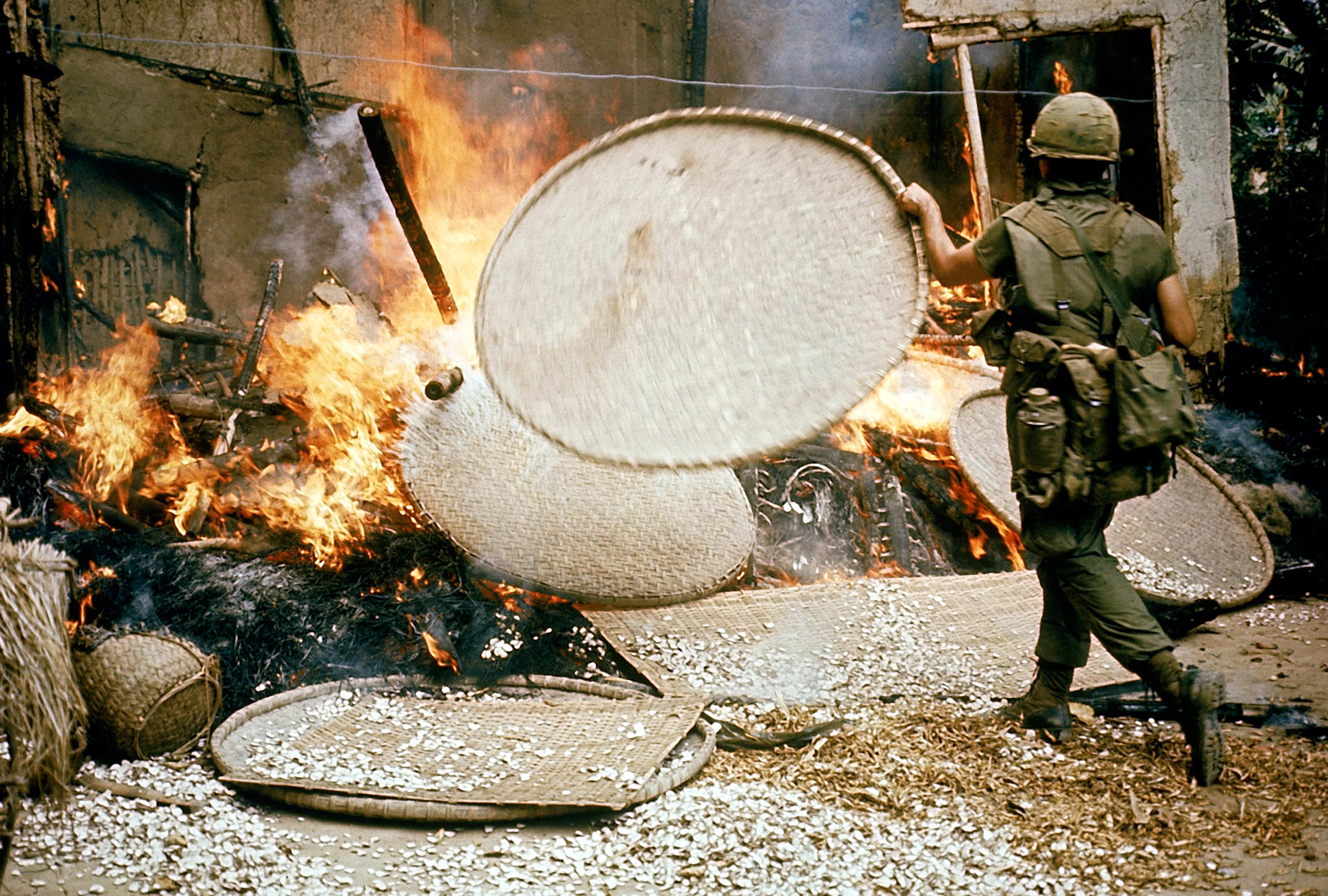
SP5 Capezza burning a dwelling

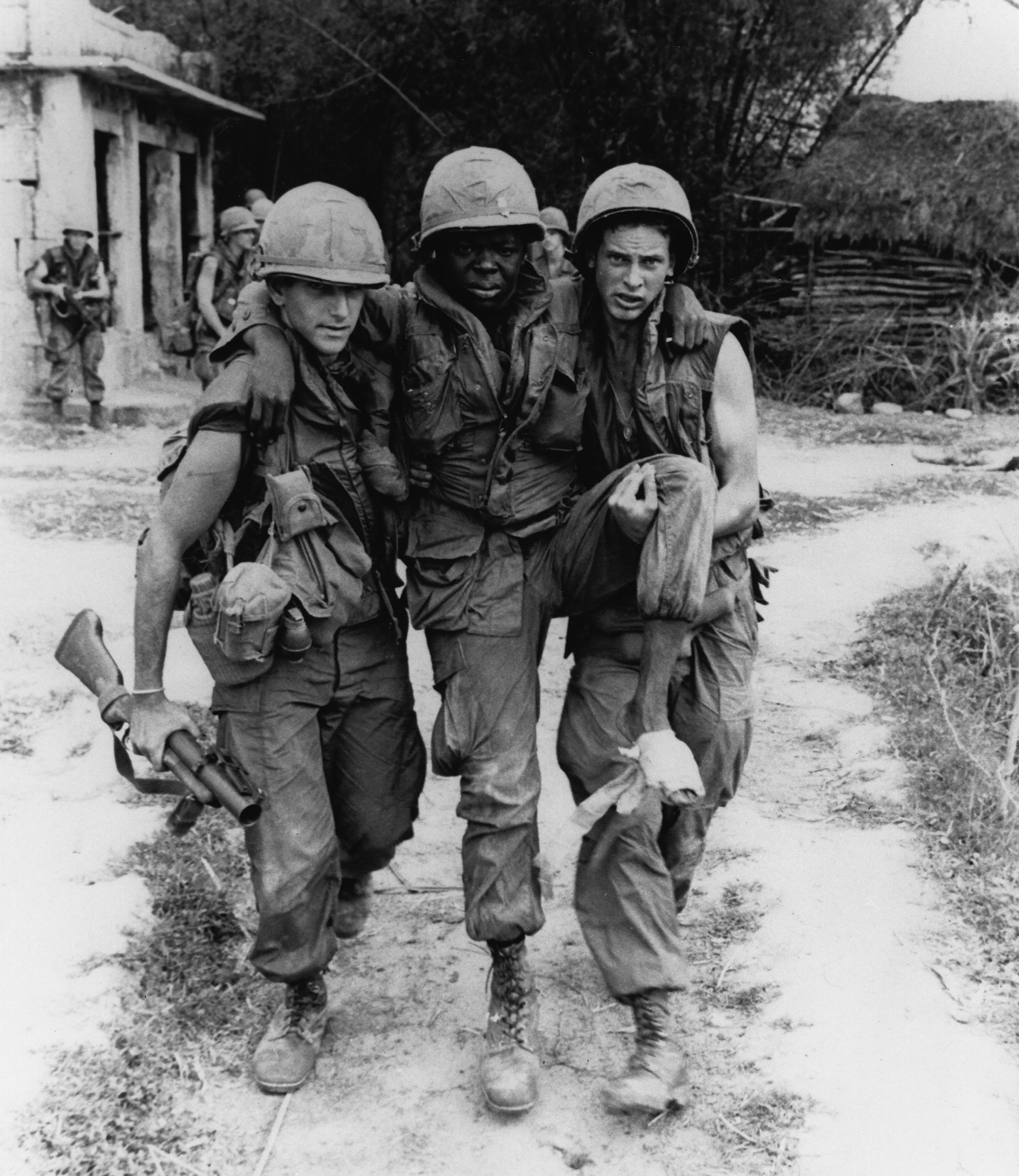
PFC Mauro, PFC Carter, and SP4 Widmer (Carter shot himself in the foot with a .45 pistol during the My Lai Massacre.)

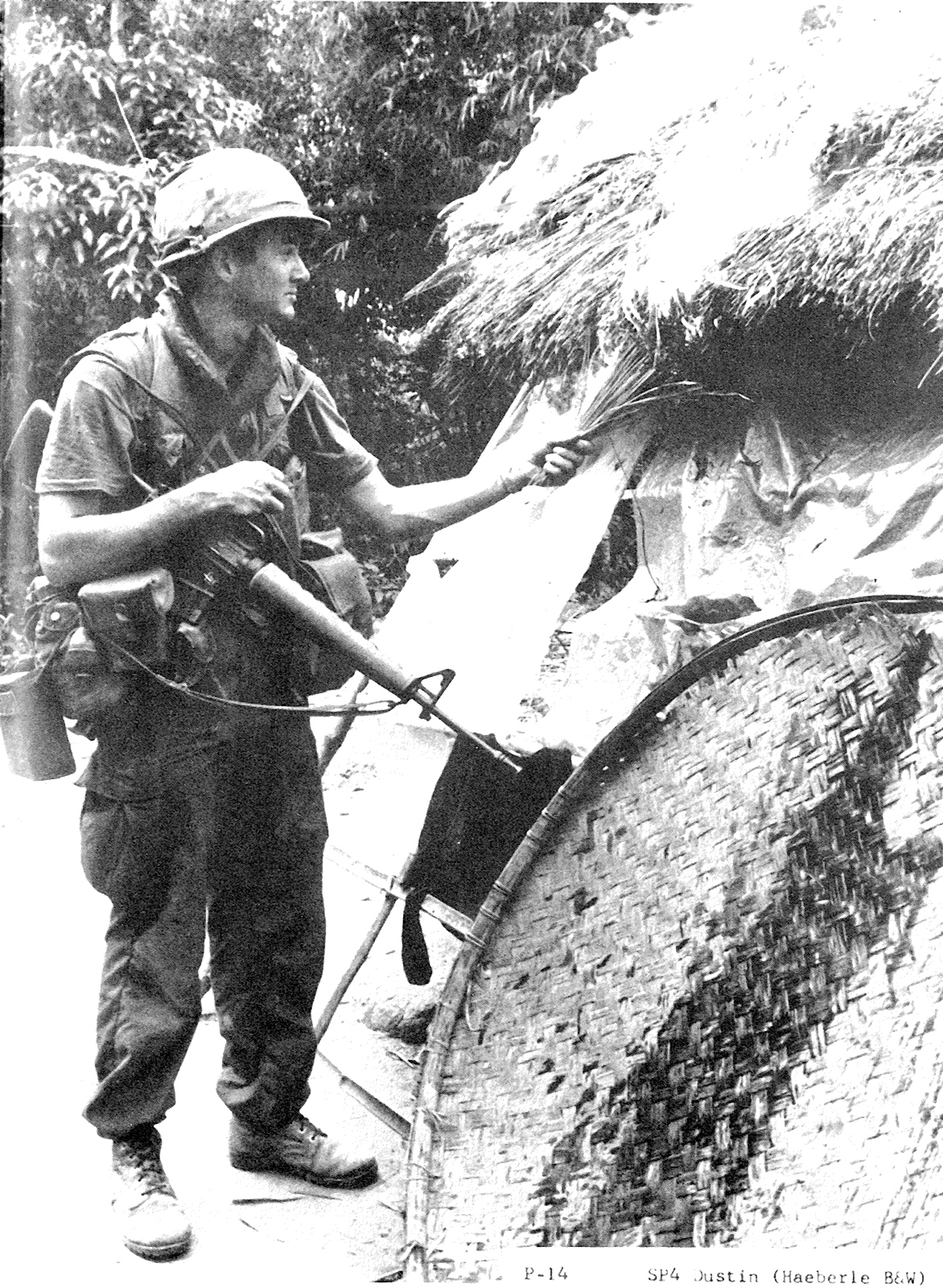
SP4 Dustin setting fire to a dwelling

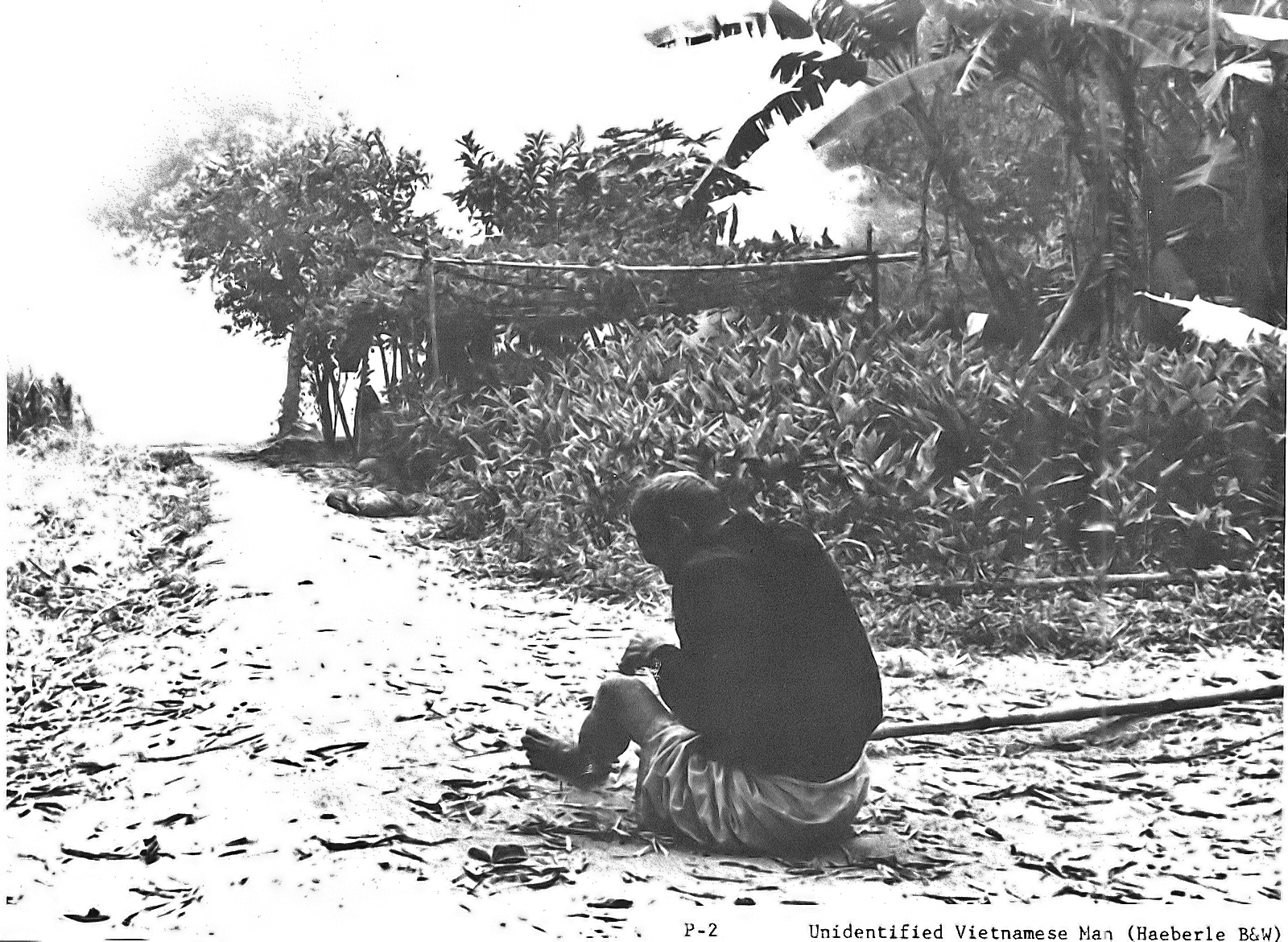
Unidentified Vietnamese man

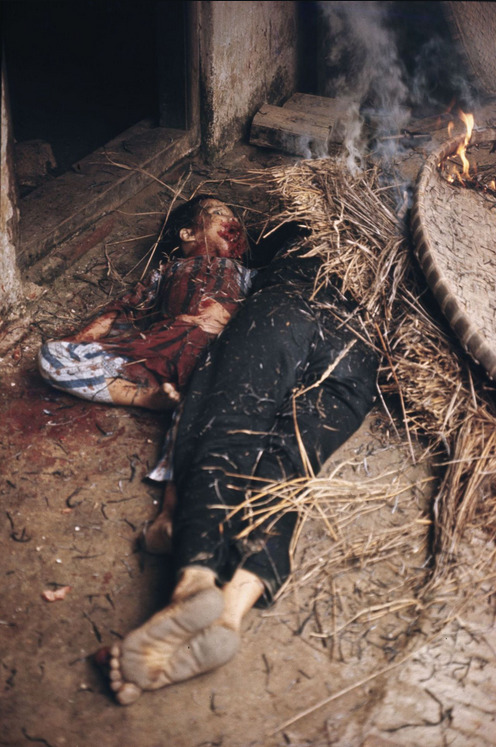
Victims at Mỹ Lai

=== Historical memorials ===
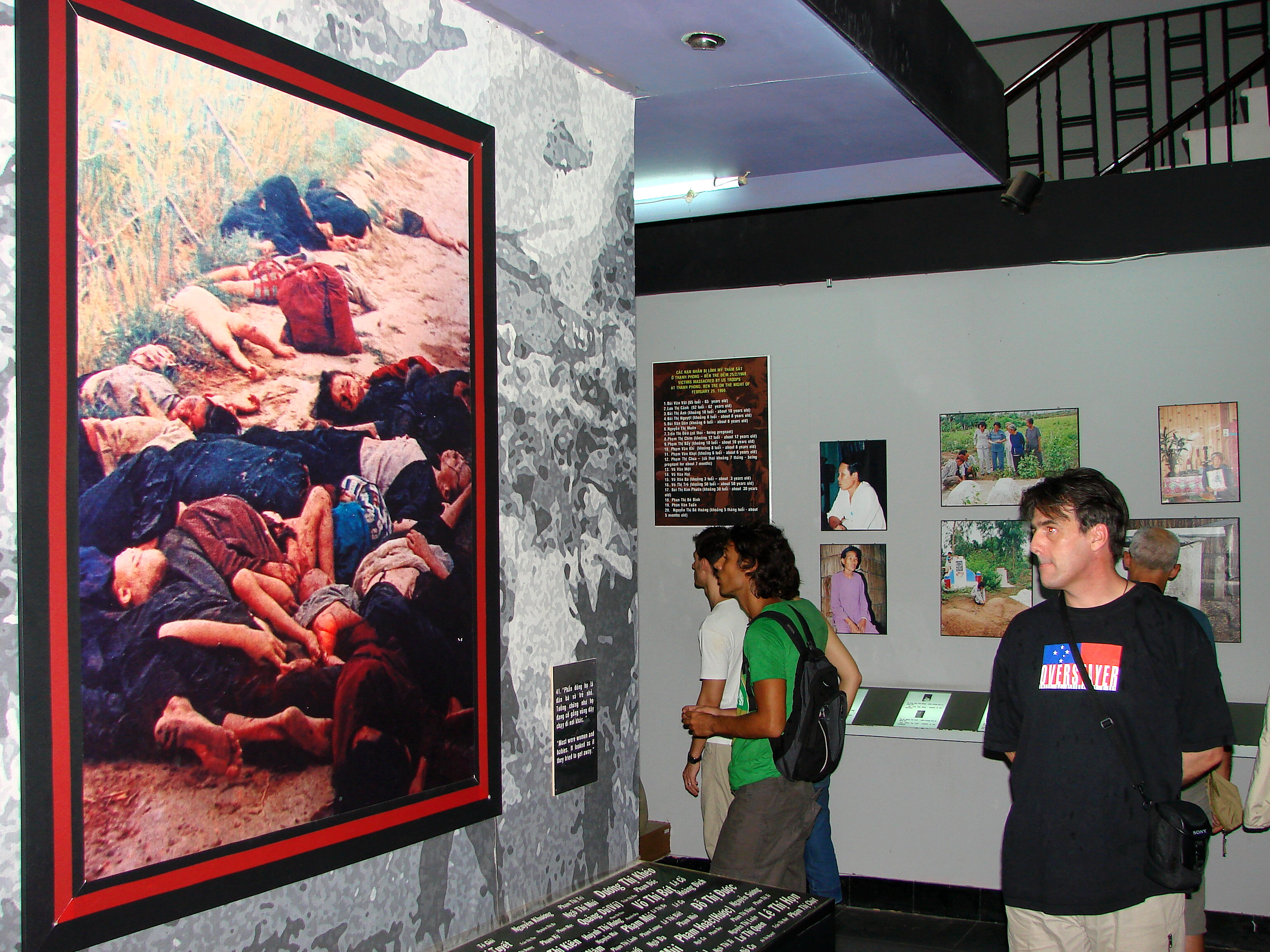
Visitors to the War Remnants Museum view enlarged photos of the massacre by Ronald Haeberle.

==== Ho Chi Minh City ====
The massacre is memorialized at two locations within Vietnam. The first is in Ho Chi Minh City at the War Remnants Museum, which contains exhibits relating to the First Indochina War and the Second Indochina War (the Vietnam War in the United States). This museum is the most popular museum in the city, attracting approximately half a million visitors every year. A number of Haeberle's photos are displayed in the museum along with other artifacts and information about the massacre.

==== Sơn Mỹ ====
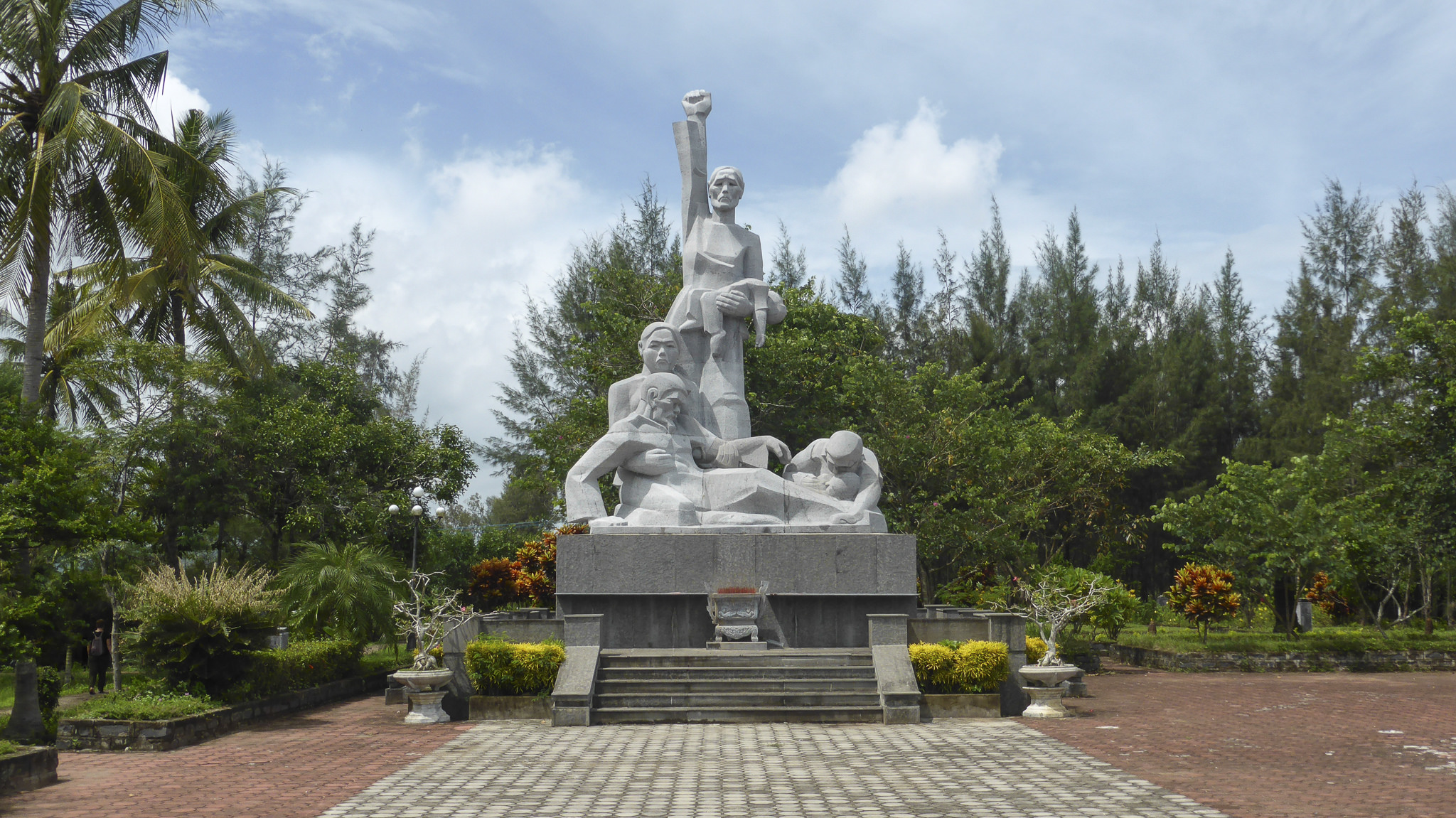
Monument of the My Lai Massacre in Sơn Mỹ, Vietnam

The second is the Sơn Mỹ Memorial Museum which is located at the site of the massacre and includes the remains of the village of Sơn Mỹ in Quảng Ngãi Province. A large black marble plaque just inside the entrance to the museum lists the names of all 504 civilians killed by the American troops, including "17 pregnant women and 210 children under the age of 13." A number of enlarged versions of Haeberle's photos are shown inside the museum. The images are dramatically backlit in color and share the central back wall with a life-size recreation of American soldiers "rounding up and shooting cowering villagers." The museum also celebrates American heroes, including Ridenhour who first exposed the killings, as well as Thompson and Colburn who intervened to save a number of villagers.

Duc Tran Van protecting his sister Thu Ha Tran in photo and statue
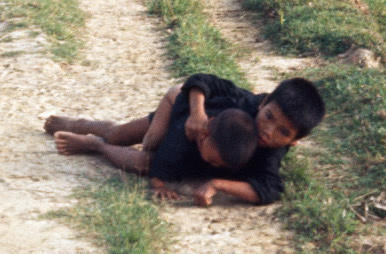

At the center of the museum grounds, which is at the heart of the destroyed village, is a large stone monument in a socialist realist style. The two children to the lower right in the sculpture are modeled on the two children in one of Haeberle's photos, often called "Two Children on a Trail". The two siblings were shot and wounded, but survived. A Buddhist prayer hall stands in the memorial complex, where monks perform rituals for the dead and visitors offering presents to the spirits of the victims.

Some American veterans choose to go on pilgrimage to the site of the massacre to heal and reconcile.

==== Mỹ Lai Peace Park ====
On the 30th anniversary of the massacre, 16 March 1998, a groundbreaking ceremony for the Mỹ Lai Peace Park was held 2 km (1 mi) away from the site of the massacre. Veterans, including Thompson and Colburn, attended the ceremony. Mike Boehm, a veteran who was instrumental in the peace park effort, said, "We cannot forget the past, but we cannot live with anger and hatred either. With this park of peace, we have created a green, rolling, living monument to peace."

On 16 March 2001, the Mỹ Lai Peace Park was dedicated, a joint venture of the Quảng Ngãi Province Women's Union, the Madison Quakers' charitable organization, and the Vietnamese government.

== See also ==
- United States war crimes
- List of photographs considered the most important
- Massacre at Huế
- Operation Wheeler/Wallowa
- Phoenix Program
- Russell Tribunal
- Tiger Force
