= Varnado =

Varnado is an Americanized form of the Greek surname Vernadakis. It is rarely found as a given name. Notable people with the name include:

- Jarvis Varnado (born 1988), American basketball player
- Victor Varnado (born 1969), American comedian and actor
- Varnado Simpson (1948–1997), United States Army soldier and mass murderer

== See also ==
- Mercedes Kaestner-Varnado (born 1992), American professional wrestler known as Sasha Banks
- Varnado, Louisiana, a village in the United States
