= VSTa =

Operating system

- Developer: Andy Valencia
- OS family: Unix-like
- Working state: Discontinued
- Source model: Open-source
- Final release: 1.6.8 / October 5, 2004; 20 years ago
- Available in: English
- Update method: Compile from source code
- Platforms: Intel 80386, Motorola 68030
- Kernel type: Microkernel
- Default user interface: Graphical user interface
- License: GNU General Public License
- Official website: www.vsta.org

Valencia's Simple Tasker (VSTa) is an operating system with a microkernel architecture, with all device drivers and file systems residing in userspace mode. It mostly complies with the Portable Operating System Interface (POSIX), except where such compliance interferes with extensibility and modularity. It is conceptually inspired by QNX and Plan 9 from Bell Labs. Written by Andy Valencia, and released under a GNU General Public License (GPL). As of 2020, the licensing for VSTa is Copyleft.

It was originally written to run on Intel 80386 hardware, and then was ported to several different platforms, e.g., Motorola 68030 based Amigas.

VSTa is no longer developed. A fork, named Flexible Microkernel Infrastructure/Operating System (FMI/OS), did not make a release.

== User interface ==
The default graphical user interface provided as a tar-ball with the system was ManaGeR (MGR).
