= Manager (disambiguation) =

A manager is an administrator of an organization.

Manager or Manage may also refer to:

== Professions ==
- Bid manager, an executive sales role within an organization, responsible for managing bids
- Business manager, for businesses
- Campaign manager, in politics
- Talent manager, for entertainers

=== Sports ===
- Manager (association football), for association football (soccer)
- Manager (baseball), head coach of a professional baseball team
- Manager (professional wrestling), a supporting character paired with a wrestler
- Coach (sport), in other sports

== Other uses ==
- Manage, Belgium, a Walloon municipality in Hainaut, Belgium
- Manager (Gaelic games), a coach of a Gaelic games team, most notably in Gaelic football and hurling
- ManaGeR, an early windowing system
- Manager (Mac OS), a component of the Mac OS operating system
- Manager Daily, a Thai newspaper
- "The Manager", less frequently known as "The Manager's Speech", a video and spoken-word B-side by Bill Drummond
- The Manager, a football club management video game from 1992, a variant of Bundesliga Manager Professional

== See also ==
- General manager, for managing both the revenue and cost elements of an organization
- Project manager, for individual projects
- Program manager
- Majordomo, the highest person on a household staff
- Supervisor
- Managing director
- Management (disambiguation)
