= Management (disambiguation) =

Management is the directing of a group of people or entities toward a goal.

Management may also refer to:

== Types of management ==
=== Business ===
- Benefits realisation management
- Brand management
- Business process management
- Change management
- Customer relationship management
- Diversity management
- Digital asset management
- Information management
- Knowledge management
- Project management
- Quality management
- Records management
- Resource management
- Risk management
- Strategic management
- Time management
- Turnaround management

=== Computing ===
- Content management
- Computer file management
- Data management
- Database management system
- Digital rights management
- Document Management
- Identity management
- Information technology management
- Memory management
- Network management
- Systems management

=== Medicine ===
- Medical case management, a collaborative process facilitating appropriate medical care
- Pain management, an intervention that is intended to relieve rather than cure
- Palliative care, used to manage the process of death
- Watchful waiting used to manage the risk that a disease or condition may worsen, rather than taking action
- Therapy is a method to treat a disease or condition
- Lifestyle management programmes are methods to promote health and avoid preventable disease
- Dieting is way to manage weight
- Disease management (health)
- Management of depression

== Other uses ==
- Management (play), 1799 comedy play by Frederic Reynolds
- Management (film), a 2009 romantic comedy-drama film
- Management (game), a 1960 business simulation board game
- MGMT (originally "The Management"), an American musical group consisting of Ben Goldwasser and Andrew VanWyngarden
- The Two Rons – also known as The Management, a spin-off series consisting of English comedy double-act Gareth Hale and Norman Pace.

== See also ==
- Manager (disambiguation)
- Administration (disambiguation)
