= Administrator =

Administrator or Admin may refer to:

== Job roles ==
=== Computing and internet ===
- Database administrator, a person who is responsible for the environmental aspects of a database
- Forum administrator, one who oversees discussions on an Internet forum
- Network administrator, engineers involved in computer networks
- Postmaster, the administrator of a mail server
- Server administrator, a person who acts as the administrator for an Internet gaming or other type of server
- Superuser, a type of computer user with administrative privileges
- Sysop, a commonly used term for a system operator, an administrator of a multi-user website
  - Wikipedia administrators
- System administrator, a person responsible for running technically advanced information systems

=== Government ===
- Administrator of the Government, in various Commonwealth realms and territories
  - Administrator (Australia), for use of the title in Australia
- In the independent agencies of the United States government, the administrator is the highest executive officer in an independent agency whose name ends with the word "administration"
- Administrator, a practitioner of public administration

=== Religion ===
- Administrator (of ecclesiastical property), anyone charged with the care of church property in the Roman Catholic Church
- Diocesan administrator, a provisional ordinary of a Roman Catholic church
- Apostolic Administrator, a prelate appointed by the Pope to serve as the ordinary for an apostolic administration
- Administrator (medieval), the ruler of a prince-bishopric in medieval times who was not confirmed by the Pope

=== Other job roles ===
- Business administration, a person responsible for the performance or management of administrative business operations
- Administrator (law), a person appointed by a court to handle the administration of an estate for someone who has died without a will
- Academic administration, administration of a school
- Arts administrator, responsible for the business end of an arts organization
- Health administration, leadership, management, and administration of health organizations

== Other uses ==
- Administrator (role), one of the roles in the Keirsey Temperament Sorter personality assessment scheme
- Administration (law), a procedure under the insolvency laws of a number of common law jurisdictions

== See also ==
- Administration (disambiguation)
- Administrative assistant
- Majordomo
