= Administration =

Administration may refer to:

== Management of organizations ==
- Management, the act of directing people towards accomplishing a goal: the process of dealing with or controlling things or people
  - Administrative assistant, traditionally known as a secretary, or also known as an administrative officer, administrative support specialist, or management assistant: a person whose work consists of supporting management
  - Administration (government), management in or of government, the management of public affairs; government
    - Administrative division, a term for an administrative region within a country that is created for the purpose of managing of land and the affairs of people
  - Academic administration, a branch of an academic institution responsible for the maintenance and supervision of the institution
  - Arts administration, a field that concerns business operations around an art organization
  - Business administration, the performance or management of business operations
    - Bachelor of Business Administration, bachelor's degree in commerce and business administration
    - Master of Business Administration, master's degree in business administration
    - Doctor of Business Administration, doctoral degree
  - Central administration, the highest administrative department of an organization
  - Engineering administration, a branch of engineering
  - Health administration, a field relating to leadership, management and administration of public health systems, hospitals and hospital networks
  - Military administration, the techniques and systems used by military services involved in the management of the armed forces
  - Public administration, advancement and implementation of government policy, or the management of public programs
    - Master of Public Administration, master's degree in public administration
    - Doctor of Public Administration, doctoral degree
- Administration (law), whereby an insolvent company can continue trading under supervision
  - Administration (British football), consequences in football when the club (as a business) enters legal administration
  - Administration in United Kingdom law

== Other uses ==
- Administration (probate law), administration of an estate on death
- Database administration, the function of managing and maintaining DBMS software
- Drug administration, delivery of a drug into the body
  - Route of administration, path by which a drug, fluid, poison or other substance is taken into body
- Land administration, the way in which the rules of Land tenure are applied and made operational
- Network administration, configuration of a computer network
- System administration, the upkeep, configuration, and reliable operation of computer systems

== See also ==
- Administrator (disambiguation)
- Management (disambiguation)
- Bureaucracy
- Presidency (US usage, as in "the Trump administration")
- Governance
