= Varnado Simpson =

American soldier (1948–1997)

- Simpson during an interview in 1969
- Born: October 7, 1948; Jackson, Mississippi, U.S.
- Died: May 4, 1997 (aged 48); Jackson, Mississippi, U.S.
- Cause of death: Suicide by gunshot
- Motive: Superior orders Mental break Rage

Details
- Victims: ~10 (initial claim); ~20–25 (1989 claim)
- Date: March 16, 1968
- Country: South Vietnam
- Location: My Lai
- Weapons: M-16 rifle M7 bayonet
- Military career
- Allegiance: United States
- Branch: United States Army
- Service years: 1967–1968
- Rank: Private First Class

Varnado Simpson (October 7, 1948 – May 4, 1997) was a U.S. Army soldier who participated in the My Lai massacre, where he personally tortured, murdered, and mutilated multiple South Vietnamese civilians. He committed suicide nearly 30 years later.

== Early career ==
Simpson graduated from Brinkley High School. When he was 18, he interrupted his second year at the University of Tennessee to join the U.S. Army as a draftee so he could "get it over with." He was posted to South Vietnam the following year. Simpson was assigned to Second Platoon, Charlie Company, under the command of Captain Ernest Medina. He was a Private First Class at the time of the massacre.

== My Lai massacre ==
Under Captain Medina's command, who said "kill anything in sight," Simpson participated in the massacre at the village of My Lai, where he reportedly killed approximately 20–25 unarmed villagers, including a mother and her baby. TIME magazine quotes him as stating: "I shot them, the lady and the little boy. He was about two years old." His official statement on the event was succinct: "I killed about eight people that day. I shot a couple of old men who were running away. I also shot some women and children. I would shoot them as they ran out of huts or tried to hide." Simpson's words from this interview were later reinterpreted by Robert Lowell in his poem "Women, Children, Babies, Cows, Cats."

After being discharged later in 1968, Simpson got a job at a bank before returning to college.

In a 1969 interview with The New York Times, Simpson admitted to killing 10 people at My Lai, and said all of them were adults. However, the day before, he confessed to NBC that he had killed a child with his mother. During the interview, when Simpson was asked if he had seen any children killed at My Lai, he said he did not want to answer that question, telling the interviewer that it was painful for him. Simpson then ended the interview abruptly by leaving early.

Simpson said he started participating in the massacre after being ordered to kill a woman by his lieutenant, Stephen Brooks. He also gave context to the aftermath:

"This lady got up and she had her back turned to me," he said. And my platoon leader...told me to shoot her and I said, 'Well, you shoot her. I don't want to shoot no lady.' So he said, I'm giving you a direct order to shoot and if you don't shoot her then you can be shot yourself. So, as she was putting her foot in the door, I shot her about five or six times, and I went there and turned her over and there was a little three‐month‐old baby in her arms... and this kind of cracked me up." "Well, after that, we had collected about five prisoners... and there come one of the guys in my squad and said, 'Well, let's kill 'em.' So the platoon leader said, 'Well, I'm turning my back so I don't see what you're doing,’ and this guy ...he grabbed my rifle and went to the heads of everyone and put it to their eyes and just pulled the trigger.... It just grew on.... My platoon leader told me—my officer, Lieutenant Brooks, said—'Kill everyone....' He was always near me ... so I think killed about 18 or 20 people that time."

At the time, Simpson said he thought he was only following orders, but had since changed his mind about the massacre. "I don't think all that should have happened—all those people," he said. "Then again, you got to realize, you got your life out there on the stake, too. I think something is going to happen to me. I dream about it a lot. Sometimes I just want to get away from people."

In a 1970 interview, when Simpson was asked what he thought was a war crime, he considered the entire Vietnam War to be a war crime.

During officer William Calley's court-martial, Simpson pleaded the fifth to avoid implicating himself. He was never charged for his role in the massacre.

== Post-military life ==
=== Personal tragedies ===
In 1977, Simpson's 10-year-old son was accidentally killed by a random shot fired by some neighborhood teenagers. Simpson recalled the day later by stating, "He died in my arms. And when I looked at him, his face was like the same face of the child that I had killed. And I said: This is the punishment for killing the people that I killed." Simpson's daughter died of meningitis a few years before he committed suicide.

=== Post-traumatic stress disorder ===
In 1982, he was admitted to a Veterans Affairs hospital in Jackson, Mississippi, where he was diagnosed with chronic and severe post-traumatic stress disorder after recounting his actions in the village, as well as his recurring fears that the dead villagers would come back to wreak vengeance upon him. For years, he lived with all of his doors and windows locked and shuttered.

In 1989, in an interview for the British documentary Four Hours in My Lai, Simpson claimed to have killed 20 to 25 people and added scalping and bodily mutilation to his description of events. "The baby’s face was half gone, my mind just went…and I just started killing. Old men, women, children, water buffaloes, everything… I just killed… That day in My Lai, I was personally responsible for killing about 25 people. Personally. Men, women. From shooting them, to cutting their throats, scalping them, to...cutting off their hands and cutting out their tongues. I did it. A lot of people were doing it, and I just followed." Simpson said something had snapped at him after the initial murder of the woman and his discovery that he had also killed a child. At this point, Simpson was heavily medicated for his severe psychological disorders.

"Once you kill, it becomes easy to kill the next one and the next one and the next one," he said. He said he had endless nightmares about the children killed by him and others, and suffered from constant tremors.

== Suicide ==
After three unsuccessful attempts, Simpson took his own life in his home on Sunday, May 4, 1997, at the age of 48, with a self-inflicted gunshot wound to the head.
