= Mere Gook Rule =

American colloquialism during Vietnam War

The "Mere Gook Rule" (MGR) was a controversial name that U.S. soldiers in the Vietnam War had for what they claim was an unofficial policy under which soldiers would be prosecuted very leniently, if at all, for harming or killing "gooks" – a commonly used derogatory slang term for the Vietnamese – even if the victims turned out to be civilians with no connection to the Viet Cong or to the North Vietnamese Army.

The supposed rationale for the MGR was the view that U.S. soldiers had difficulty determining which Vietnamese were civilians and which were enemies. To the extent that soldiers believed the MGR existed, it effectively gave them permission to kill Vietnamese, even if there was a very good chance that they were civilians. Authors have argued that the MGR contributed to a climate in which the United States committed many war crimes in Vietnam. Others argue that it created a racist climate in which women could be raped and even children could be killed as long as they were "mere gooks".

The very existence of the MGR is controversial. Some authors deny that case evidence from courts-martial in Vietnam support the existence of any MGR. [meaning unclear] In example to the contrary, Nick Turse argues that the MGR was one of the policies that allowed Sergeant Roy E. Bumgarner, known as "the bummer," to amass a high body count. Some rumors placed his and his squad's body count at 1,500 Vietnamese, almost all of them civilians, over his seven years in Vietnam. In 1969, Bumgarner was convicted of manslaughter over the killing of four Vietnamese civilians and covering it up after the fact, but was given only a six month-loss in pay and was later reinstated for another tour of duty.
