= Battle of FSB Mary Ann =

Part of the Vietnam War (1971)

- Part of the Vietnam War
Date	28 March 1971
Location	15°18′20″N 108°6′37″E; Quảng Tín Province, South Vietnam; MGRS AS 962-998
Result	Viet Cong victory

Belligerents
United States; South Vietnam	Viet Cong

Commanders and leaders
William P. Doyle	Unknown

Units involved
(United States) 1st Battalion, 46th Infantry Regiment (South Vietnam) Battery B, 22nd Field Artillery	Military Region 5: 409th VC Main Force Sapper Battalion

Strength
(United States) 231 (South Vietnam) 21	91

Casualties and losses
33 killed	US body count: 15 killed

The Battle of FSB Mary Ann occurred when Viet Cong (VC) sappers attacked a U.S. firebase located in Quảng Tín Province, South Vietnam early on the morning of 28 March 1971.

Fire Support Base (FSB) Mary Ann was established to interdict movement of North Vietnamese People's Army of Vietnam (PAVN) and VC troops and materiel down the K-7 Corridor and Dak Rose Trail (branches of the Ho Chi Minh trail running from Laos to the coast of South Vietnam). Originally intended to be a temporary base, it evolved into a more permanent location garrisoned by at least one U.S. Army company. The base was manned by 231 American soldiers at the time of the attack.

The firebase was scheduled to be handed over to the Army of the Republic of Vietnam (ARVN) when the U.S. 1st Battalion, 46th Infantry Regiment moved north to Da Nang. Twenty-one soldiers from the ARVN Battery B, 22nd Field Artillery, along with two 105mm howitzers, were on Mary Ann to support ARVN operations to the south.

For months leading up to the attack the level of enemy activity in the area had been low and contacts were infrequent. The lack of significant recent engagements, along with preparations to turn the FSB over to ARVN units, had given U.S. soldiers in the area a false sense of security. The sapper attack was successful, and was described as a "rampage of VC who threw satchels at the command bunker, knifed Americans in their sleep and destroyed all communications equipment". Army Chief of Staff William Westmoreland investigated the attack, which resulted in repercussions up the 23rd Infantry Division's chain of command, with the probe citing dereliction of duty, lax behavior and failure of officer leadership as the reasons for the attack. Charges were brought against six officers, including the 23rd Division commander and assistant division commander.

== Background and base construction ==
FSB Mary Ann was established on 19 February 1970 by elements of the 1st battalion, 46th Infantry, part of the 196th Light Infantry Brigade (196th LIB). At the time it was not intended to be a permanent base, and was closed by the same battalion about two months after it was opened. Operational needs brought 1/46th Infantry back to Mary Ann on 27 June, and the base was reestablished. According to one battalion commander it was a poor location for a firebase from a defensive standpoint. "[The FSB was built] in a saddle with hills around it on three sides." It was also at the very edge of helicopter range from the Americal Division headquarters at Chu Lai. Any other location in the region would have put the FSB outside the range of the Division's heavy artillery batteries and prevented artillery at Mary Ann from shelling key locations in the region. From an offensive standpoint the FSB was in a good location since it straddled the Dak Rose Trail network.

FSB Mary Ann's construction was no different from many other U.S. firebases in South Vietnam. Running northwest to southeast, the firebase stretched 500 meters along the crest of a 200-meter-high (660 ft) ridge connecting two hillsides. Only 75 meters wide at its narrowest point, Mary Ann widened to 125 meters at the northwest and southeast ends. A trench, "knee-deep in certain stretches and waist-deep in others" defined the base's perimeter and connected the base's twenty-two bunkers. Like any typical late-war FSB, most of Mary Ann's bunkers were made from converted metal shipping containers known as conexes. In addition to the conex bunkers, Mary Ann had over thirty assorted structures (hootches, sandbagged bunkers, and other makeshift structures). The southeast end of FSB Mary Ann contained the battalion tactical operations center (B-TOC) and company command post (CP), both located next to a small helipad. The base's mess halls, a communication center, the battalion medical aid station, ammunition bunkers, storage for general supplies, and two artillery firing positions were also located at this end of the FSB. The northwest end of the base contained a second artillery position with two 155mm howitzers, the fire direction center and the artillery command post. The saddle between the two ends of the FSB served as the resupply helipad. Dirt roads divided both ends of the base, and also ran outside the wire at two points: southwest past a firing range to the spring that served as the base's water point and northwest to the trash dump.

Soon after being reopened, FSB Mary Ann was probed many times (four attempts are recorded between July and August 1970) and one author states that the base could have been easily observed from the high ground surrounding its location. The last major contact in the area was a firefight on 13 August, when Company A, 1/46th Infantry hit and overran "what was probably the NVA command post for the area." After that firefight, organized resistance seemed to cease. That quiet, combined with the usual cycle of replacements at all levels of American units (from individual riflemen to the company and battalion commanders), led to what the outgoing battalion commander called an "awfully complacent" mindset.

== Conditions prior to the attack ==
At the time of the attack, FSB Mary Ann was garrisoned by Company C, 1/46th Infantry, a 75-man unit commanded by Captain Richard V. Knight. In addition, 18 men from Company E's Reconnaissance Platoon were at the base preparing for an operation the following day. These troops shared space with 34 support personnel (medics, radiomen, etc.) from 1/46th Infantry's Headquarters and Headquarters Company (HHC). The rest of the garrison (less the ARVN artillerymen) came from elements of A, B, and D Companies, 1/46th Infantry (22 men who were in transit between their units and areas further to the rear), and assorted artillery personnel (including the crew of a quad-.50 caliber machine gun from Battery G, 55th Air Defense Artillery Regiment). According to one source all ground surveillance radars and night vision (starlite) scopes formerly at Mary Ann were "sent to the battalion rear for maintenance." This left the base with a series of ground sensors designed to detect movement located "within fifteen hundred to forty-eight hundred meters" of the perimeter. These sensors had been picking up movement since shortly after the base was reopened, but no contact had ever resulted from the readings.

Company C was the only complete company at Mary Ann due to operations south and east of the FSB near a location called Landing Zone (LZ) Mildred (15.3986°N 108.25°E). Companies A and B, 1/46th Infantry, were on the ground in that area of operations, and some of the artillery previously located at Mary Ann had been moved to LZ Mildred to support operations there (including the 81mm mortars assigned to both companies and the heavy 4.2-inch mortars normally part of Company E). Prior to the attack, the attention of the battalion commander, Lieutenant Colonel Doyle, was focused more on operations near LZ Mildred. In fact, the battalion command post was scheduled to move there on 28 March. This impending move led to a freeze on all new construction at Mary Ann, including fencing to block the roads leading out of the FSB.

Early accounts of the attack state that the defenders "failed to safeguard the perimeter" of the FSB. The only single volume study written about the attack by Keith Nolan contests this position, pointing out that "historians [including the author of the book, who had discussed Mary Ann in an earlier work] got it wrong." Even with this new perspective, there are indications that alertness at Mary Ann was not as good as it could have been. Many accounts by men stationed at Mary Ann mention that perimeter security was uneven at best. One member of the 1/46th Infantry Headquarters Company stated that "I don't think Captain Knight had a clue as to how lax the security was ... because in that area, and only that area, Knight wasn't diligent. He left it up to his lieutenants and sergeants to check the bunker line." In many cases they failed to do so, and the failure was compounded by Company C being understrength and unable to man all the perimeter bunkers. Manning bunkers was not the only problem. Tripflares located in the Concertina wire around the base were not always reset or replaced when they went off, a common occurrence caused in some cases by the rotor wash created by large CH-47 Chinook helicopters bringing in supplies or backhauling material as 1/46th Infantry prepared to hand the base over to the ARVN. This lax attitude, combined with the skill of the attacking sappers, had fatal consequences for many in Company C. Although not "cringing in their bunkers", the defenders of Mary Ann were not prepared for a ground attack. This lack of readiness was not noted by the 196th LIB commander, Colonel William S. Hathaway, during a visit to the base on 27 March, the day before the attack. He later stated that what he had seen at Mary Ann that day "was a big improvement over that I had seen before ... the troops were alert."

== Battle ==
In the predawn hours of 28 March sappers from the VC 409th Sapper Battalion approached the wire of FSB Mary Ann and took up positions to launch an attack. The exact number of sappers involved is uncertain, but most sources agree that there were at least 50. As was common practice for such units, the sappers wore khaki shorts and soot camouflage and were armed with either an AK-47 or RPG-7 and satchel charges and grenades to attack bunkers. Sappers relied on stealth, shock and surprise to give them an advantage, and rarely carried heavy weapons or equipment. The 409th was known to the intelligence section of the 196th LIB, but had previously operated against ARVN targets north of Quang Tin Province. It was assumed by the 196th LIB's intelligence personnel that both the 409th and the 402nd Sapper Battalions were east of FSB Mary Ann, preparing to attack ARVN targets in that region. None of them predicted an attack on the U.S. base.

The ground attack targeted the south side of FSB where the ground gently sloped away from the perimeter. The northeast side was marked by a steep slope toward a river, not advantageous terrain for a sapper attack. The sappers moved in small squads of three to six men, cutting four paths through the base's two outer concertina barriers. They took more time moving through the third barrier, which was about 20 meters from the bunker line, and then fanned out along the southwest side of the line. Following standard sapper doctrine, any attack would begin as soon as the mortar barrage commenced. The first 82 mm mortar shells hit FSB Mary Ann at 02:30, signaling the start of the ground attack.

Once through the wire, the sappers scattered toward key targets: the FSB's artillery, the bunker serving as the battalion tactical operations center (B-TOC), the company command post, and many of the perimeter bunkers. Their attack was aided by tear gas, delivered either by sappers (using grenades) or mixed in with regular high-explosive mortar rounds as part of the bombardment. Nolan also documents the VC use of CS gas in his narrative of the attack.

The attack against the B-TOC was made easier by Doyle's failure to post armed guards at the bunker's entrances (which was a violation of brigade policy), preventing any early warning. The sappers used a combination of CS gas and satchel charges in their attack on the bunker (coming at about 02:44 - the time is known because a radio operator in the bunker reported it to the FDC as direct mortar hits and the time was logged), effectively disrupting the command structure on the firebase. At about the same time, the radio operator requested illumination rounds from supporting artillery batteries, but did not indicate that Mary Ann was under ground attack. The south end of the B-TOC was burning by this time, the fire started by a satchel charge igniting a case of white phosphorus grenades located near the south bunker entrance.

The sappers moved through the base from south to north, attacking bunkers and firing positions with grenades and satchel charges. The ground attack lasted about half an hour according to one source. Once the ground attack was confirmed at 02:50, Doyle requested artillery fire around the hill, a flareship, and gunships. He also asked for medevacs. Artillery at nearby firebases (Hawk Hill, LZ Mildred and Firebase Pleasantville (10.865°N 109.617°E)) began firing illumination rounds and counter-mortar patterns quickly, but there was "considerable delay" in firing the defensive target (DT) patterns around FSB Mary Ann. One battery had failed to plot any DTs near Mary Ann, based on the battalion's planned relocation to LZ Mildred, while the artillery officer at FSB Pleasantville delayed firing because the situation at Mary Ann was still unclear. The sappers speed and surprise prevented Mary Ann's own guns from firing DTs because cannon crews were defending their positions instead of manning the guns.

Unlike many of the conex bunkers, the B-TOC was of wooden construction and "weatherproofed with tar, so it burned rapidly." After calling for fire support, Doyle made the decision around 02:51 to evacuate the burning structure, and ordered the command staff to relocate to the aid station. Prior to shifting the radios, Captain Paul Spilberg called for artillery fire "fifty meters out, three-hundred-and-sixty degrees around our position." Once the radios had been established at the aid station, he and Doyle discovered that Company C's CP (the designated alternate location for the battalion command post) had been hit and partly destroyed.

The Company C command post had been one of the sappers' first targets, and was hit by the first two to three mortar shells of the attack. Constructed mostly of wooden ammunition crates and sandbags, it proved just as vulnerable to fire as the B-TOC. Coming under direct fire from both AK-47s and RPGs, the bunker quickly collapsed. Knight was killed in the first few minutes of the attack, as were most of his command staff.

Along the base perimeter, most of the troops took cover in their conex bunkers when the mortar barrage began. This allowed the sappers to close rapidly without any danger of return fire, and in many cases they were through the lines before the defenders moved from their bunkers to the sandbagged trench line. The first man to report seeing the sappers had been sleeping on top of his bunker, but didn't spot them until they were "two-thirds of the way to the trench that connected the bunkers." Many of 1/46th Infantry's casualties occurred during this period and were concentrated among those units along the gently sloping side of the base. Company C's 1st Platoon, occupying bunkers 15-19 along the side of the perimeter that had a steep slope, was relatively untouched by the initial assault and manned their positions in the trench line. By contrast, 2nd Platoon in the southern sector had ten men killed and eleven wounded before Doyle and Spilberg moved toward the Company C command post.

Company C's 3rd Platoon, holding the sector of the perimeter marked by Bunkers 9–13, also took heavy losses. The platoon leader, First Lieutenant Barry McGee, was killed fighting hand-to-hand with sappers, and the teams coming through that sector moved on to attack both the 155 mm howitzer position on the high ground to the northwest and the supply elements near the main resupply helipad. The sappers destroyed a number of structures near the pad, killing or wounding a number of Headquarters personnel in the process.

After the initial shock of the attack, some men began to mount effective resistance to the sappers. Shortly after Doyle and Spilberg reached the partly destroyed Company C command post, the base's quad .50 began firing, "walking bursts down the hill and into the valley - and straight across into the next hillside". The crew continued firing until dawn, when the four barrels on the weapon burned out. Spilberg also began collecting survivors near the CP and aid station, moving casualties and setting up makeshift defenses.

Although artillery had been firing in defense of Mary Ann since soon after the first word of the attack reached brigade headquarters, it was 03:25 before the first air assets appeared overhead. A Night Hawk helicopter from D Troop, 1st Squadron, 1st Cavalry Regiment (accompanied by a chase ship intended to drop flares and rescue the Night Hawk crew if there were problems) came on station and began engaging targets on the southeast slope of the hill. Forced to break station to refuel, the pilot (Captain Norman Hayes) learned that the additional gunships and medevac helicopters he had requested when he came on station above Mary Ann had yet to be launched from the airstrip at Chu Lai. Communications failures left both brigade and division headquarters believing that Mary Ann was only being shelled by mortars, making the need for air support appear less critical. While Hayes was refueling, only his chase ship (a UH-1 from Company A, 123rd Aviation Battalion) was airborne over the base. They provided what fire support they could using door guns and grenades, and before breaking station to refuel they landed at the small helipad and picked up "six or seven" of the most critical casualties and evacuated them to Chu Lai.

The sappers had broken contact by the time the brigade commander, Hathaway, had his command helicopter landed at Mary Ann. Wounded men were being evacuated steadily by this time, and helicopter gunships were making firing runs on targets outside the base's wire. Hathaway's reaction to what he saw on the ground was later described by Spilberg as if "[he] had just walked into Auschwitz." Hathaway was just the first of a number of higher-ranking officers to fly into Mary Ann. The division commander, Major General James L. Baldwin, arrived shortly after 07:00 to assess the damage. By 09:00 the battalion executive officer arrived to take over from Doyle, and at 11:00 Company D was lifted in to replace Company C as the FSB's garrison element. The North Vietnamese took the base under fire with a 12.7mm machine gun at about 16:00 that afternoon, wounding one American and reminding Mary Ann's garrison that they were still under observation.

== War crime controversy and aftermath ==
=== Uncertain number of VC casualties ===
The battle at FSB Mary Ann inflicted serious losses on the defenders, who suffered 33 killed and 83 wounded. Overall VC casualties remain uncertain, but 15 bodies were located in the aftermath of the attack. Blood trails and drag marks indicated that the VC may have suffered more casualties, but the extent of those losses was never verified.

=== Burning the bodies of enemy combatants in a trash dump ===
The VC bodies sparked the first of many controversies that came from the battle. Following standard procedure, Hathaway gave orders for the 15 VC bodies to be buried "before they became a health hazard." Major Donald Potter, 1/46 Infantry's executive officer, issued instructions that the bodies be buried in an eroded section near the resupply LZ. For reasons that never become clear, five of the bodies were transported instead to the base trash dump. By the time this was noticed, it was past 12:00 and the bodies were beginning to bloat in the heat. Rather than move the bodies again, Potter instructed the commander of Company D to "go on and burn them down there in the trash dump."

Burning the bodies of enemy combatants is potentially a war crime and would need to be reported to MACV for investigation, but Potter did not seem to realize this. Nolan also notes that the bodies were repeatedly burned over the next several days. When Baldwin later learned of the burned bodies, he too failed to report this to MACV and would ultimately be charged with "failing to report a known incident of the mishandling of enemy bodies."

=== Possible VC infiltration within the ranks of the ARVN contingent ===
Prior to the attack on FSB Mary Ann, there had been reports of possible VC infiltration within the ranks of the ARVN contingent present on Mary Ann. In one incident, a man wearing the insignia of an ARVN lieutenant inquired about the easiest way to get off the firebase because his men wanted to go fishing. He was told the easiest way in and out of the camp was the south end of the firebase. During the battle, some of the enemy gunfire seemed to come from the ARVN section of the camp. However, one U.S. soldier who was wounded and remained in the ARVN sector for the duration of the fight stated later that he never saw any ARVN firing toward US positions. The ARVN battery was located in the northern sector of the base, which was not attacked by the sappers, and this may in part account for their inaction. The 23rd Infantry Division's Inspector General (IG) team noted that the northeastern side of the base was "generally untouched, including the battalion ammunition storage area. The actions of ARVN soldiers were no different from many U.S. soldiers in taking cover until the attack was over." The ARVN decided not to garrison the firebase after the attack and it was closed on 24 April.

=== Investigation of perceived failures and replacement of the commander ===
Both the attack and events that followed (including the burning of the VC bodies in the FSB's trash dump) led to an investigation by the 23rd Infantry Division's Inspector General and a separate investigation by the IG at MACV level. While the IG report limited its findings to suggestions that "[a] Strong command emphasis be placed on upgrading fire base security procedures and improving defensive measures against sapper attacks", the MACV IG findings were much more serious, tracing the failures all the way up to division command level.

Events at FSB Mary Ann had repercussions throughout the chain of command of both the 23rd Infantry Division and the 196th LIB. In July 1971, Baldwin was replaced as commander of the 23rd Infantry Division, with military sources quoted in news reports suggesting he was relieved because of the attack on FSB Mary Ann. Other sources indicate that Baldwin was technically "reassigned" and not relieved of command (which is a more serious, official action). In spite of recommendations by the deputy MACV IG that he be reduced in rank and given a letter of reprimand, Baldwin received the milder punishment of a letter of admonishment and retired as a major general in 1972. Hathaway was removed from the promotion list for brigadier general, and Doyle was reprimanded. Doyle remained in service until his retirement but did not receive another promotion. In the end, six officers (including Baldwin and the assistant division commander) received some sort of disciplinary action from the Secretary of the Army.

== FSB Mary Ann and history of the Vietnam War ==
The fight at FSB Mary Ann has been used by historians to illustrate the decline of American military units in Vietnam. Historians taking this position include Shelby Stanton and Lewis Sorley, giving the action high prominence in accounts of the U.S. Army's last years in Vietnam. Sorley's account is particularly harsh, stating that the 1/46th Infantry "was riddled by drugs and incompetence" and that "[t]he disaster was compounded by a cover-up that extended all the way up to the Division commander." Keith Nolan initially had a similar opinion, but later changed his mind after researching the action and writing his definitive account Sappers in the Wire. Sorley's mention of a cover-up is also difficult to reconcile with the investigation mounted by the division's Inspector General dated 12 May, just weeks after the attack.

Sorley's account further states that FSB Mary Ann was somehow unique. "Had there been other units as careless and undisciplined as the one at Mary Ann, surely the enemy would have discovered and exploited their weaknesses just as ruthlessly. Yet that did not happen." However, there were other serious attacks mounted by VC and PAVN units (sappers and regular units) against fire support bases during the Vietnam War.

Less than three years earlier, in August 1968, a Dac Cong sapper unit attacked the MACV-SOG Forward Operating Base 4 near Da Nang. The compound, home to command and control elements of SOG's Command and Control North (CCN), was considered a high-security facility manned by elite troops, but during the attack "a dozen Green Berets were killed, along with an unknown number of their Nùng mercenaries." Coincidentally, one of the officers present at FSB Mary Ann had also been at the CCN compound when it was attacked. Sappers also attacked elements of the 101st Airborne Division (Airmobile) in March 1971 at the old Khe Sanh Combat Base. Opened to support ARVN operations in Laos during Operation Lam Son 719, Khe Sanh contained a number of fuel storage locations and maintenance facilities for helicopters. The sappers took losses, but reached the runway and demolished both ammunition stores and fuel tanks. Similar attacks took place against Firebase Crook in 1969 and Firebase Illingworth in 1970.
