= XXIV Corps (United States) =

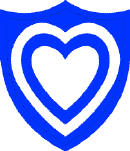
- Shoulder sleeve insignia of XXIV Corps
- Active: 30 March 1944–25 January 1949; 15 August 1968–30 June 1972
- Country: United States of America
- Branch: United States Army
- Role: Headquarters
- Size: Corps
- Motto: Honed in Combat
- Engagements: World War II; Leyte; Okinawa; Vietnam; Tet Counteroffensive; Counteroffensive, Phase lV; Counteroffensive, Phase V; Counteroffensive, Phase VI; Summer- Fall 1969; Winter- Spring 1970; Sanctuary Counteroffensive; Counteroffensive, Phase VII; Consolidation I; Consolidation II; Cease-Fire
- Decorations: Meritorious Unit Commendation 1968; Meritorious Unit Commendation 1968-1970; Meritorious Unit Commendation 1970-1971; Meritorious Unit Commendation 1971-1972; Philippine Presidential Unit Citation; Republic of Vietnam Cross of Gallantry with Palm

Insignia
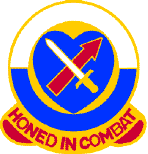
- Distinctive unit insignia

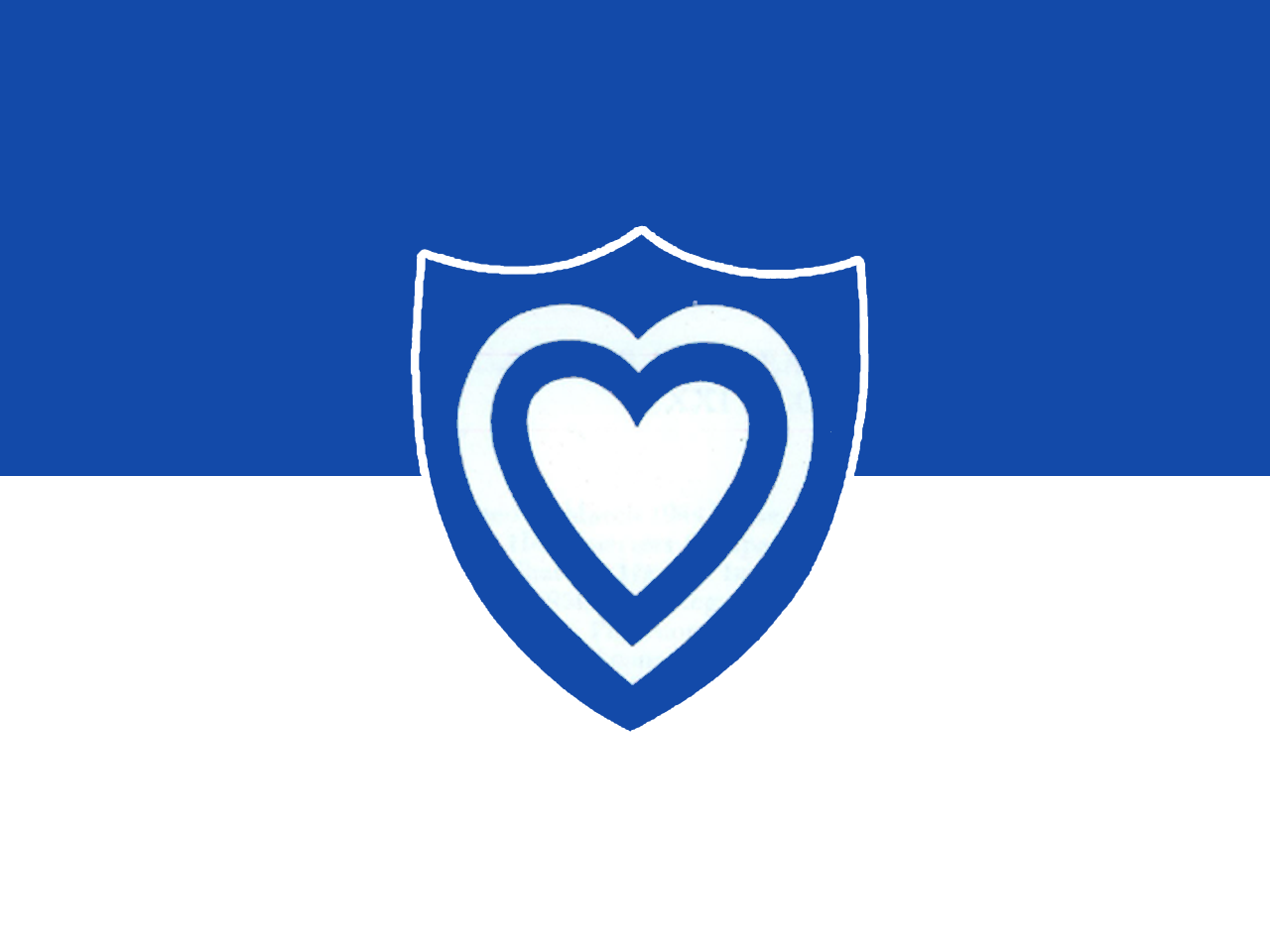
- XXIV Corps Flag

XXIV Corps (24th Corps) was a U.S. Army Corps-level command during World War II and the Vietnam War.

== History ==
=== World War II ===
XXIV Corps was activated at Fort Shafter, Hawaii, on 8 April 1944. It participated in the invasion of Leyte in the Philippine Islands on 20 October 1944, with the 7th Infantry Division and 96th Infantry Division its major combat units. During the campaign on Leyte and aided by Filipino regular and constable force of the Philippine Commonwealth Army and Philippine Constabulary military units, the 77th Infantry Division came under control of XXIV Corps.

From 1 April to 30 June 1945, XXIV Corps and its divisions participated in the invasion of Okinawa. In September 1945, after the surrender of Japan, XXIV Corps was assigned to execute Operation Blacklist Forty, accepting the surrender of forces of the Japanese Korean Army stationed south of the 38th parallel. XXIV corps then established the United States Army Military Government in Korea, controlling the southern half of the peninsula until 1948. Following the end of the occupation, XXIV corps was formally disbanded on 25 January 1949.

=== Vietnam ===
XXIV Corps was created on 15 August 1968 to replace the "Provisional Corps Vietnam," a temporary headquarters (known as MACV Forward Command Post or MACV Forward between 25 January and 10 March) created 10 March 1968 during the Tet Offensive. Upon its formation, XXIV Corps was placed under the operational control of the III Marine Force to control the activities of U.S. Army ground combat units deployed in northern South Vietnam and had its headquarters at Phu Bai until 9 March 1970, when it relocated to Camp Horn, Da Nang. At that time it assumed control of all U.S. ground forces in I Corps Tactical Zone (I CTZ), with all remaining Marine units coming under its operational control until their withdrawal. During its service in Vietnam XXIV Corps was a component command of Headquarters, US Army Vietnam (USARV).

==== Area of responsibility and units assigned ====
XXIV Corps' area of responsibility was I Corps Tactical Zone ("Eye Corps"), later renamed Military Region 1, which comprised the five northernmost provinces of the South Vietnam. At various times it controlled the following units:

- 1st Cavalry Division (Airmobile)
- 23rd Infantry Division (Americal)
- 101st Airborne Division (Airmobile)
- 1st Brigade, 5th Infantry Division
- 3rd Brigade, 82nd Airborne Division
- 108th Artillery Group
- III Marine Expeditionary Force
- 3rd Marine Amphibious Brigade
- Task Force Clearwater (U.S. Navy)

=== Inactivation ===
XXIV Corps was inactivated on 30 June 1972 in the final stages the withdrawal of U.S. ground combat forces from Vietnam, and its assets formed the basis for its successor, the First Regional Assistance Command (FRAC).

== Commanders ==
- Major General John R. Hodge (9 April 1944 – 15 August 1948)
- Major General John B. Coulter (1948-9)
- Lt. General Richard Stilwell (1968–9)
- Lt. General Melvin Zais (1969–70)
- Lt. General James W. Sutherland (1970–1)
- Lt. Gen. Welborn G. Dolvin (1971-2)

=== Deputy commanders ===
- Major General Clifford B. Drake (May 1968 - June 1969)
- Major General Edwin B. Wheeler (June 1969 - April 1970)
- Major General George S. Bowman Jr. (April 1970 - August 1970)
- Major General James L. Baldwin (August 1970 - November 1970)
- Major General Albert E. Milloy (November 1970 - 1971)
- Major General James F. Hollingsworth (1971 - 1972)
- Major General Frederick Kroesen (1972)

=== Chiefs of Staff ===
- Brigadier General Crump Garvin (1944–46)
- Brigadier General Alexander R. Bolling Jr. (1968–69)
- Brigadier General William E. Shedd III (1969–70)
- Brigadier General Oliver B. Patton (1970–72)

=== Artillery commanders ===
- Brigadier General Arthur M. Harper (1944 - 44)
- Brigadier General Josef R. Sheetz (1944–45)
- Brigadier General Allan G. Pixton (1968–69)
- Brigadier General Robert C. Hixon (1969–70)
- Brigadier General Stewart C. Meyer (1970–71)
- Brigadier General Robert J. Koch (1971–72)

=== Chief Engineer ===
- Brigadier General Frederic B. Butler (1947)
