= Lloyd B. Ramsey =

American army general officer, major-general

Lloyd Brinkley Ramsey
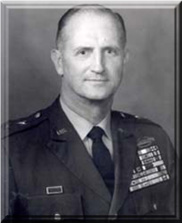
- Ramsey c. 1970
- Born: 29 May 1918; Somerset, Kentucky
- Died: 23 February 2016 (aged 97)
- Burial place: Arlington National Cemetery
- Military career
- Allegiance: United States of America
- Branch: United States Army
- Service years: 1940-1974
- Rank: Major general
- Nickname: Feller
- Commands: United States Army Provost Marshal General; 23rd Infantry Division
- Conflicts: World War II; Vietnam War
- Awards: Distinguished Service Medal (2); Silver Star (3); Legion of Merit (2); Distinguished Flying Cross; Bronze Star (4); Purple Heart (5); Air Medal (17); Gallantry Cross with Palm; Armed Forces Honor Medal First Class; Croix de Guerre; Order of the British Empire

Major General Lloyd B. Ramsey (29 May 1918 – 23 February 2016) was a United States Army officer who served in World War II and the Vietnam War.

== Early life ==
He was born on 29 May 1918 in Somerset, Kentucky, the youngest of three brothers. He graduated from Somerset High School in 1936, where he served as senior class president. Afterward he enrolled the University of Kentucky graduating in 1940.

== Military career ==
He enlisted in the Army in May 1940. In November 1942 he was serving with the 39th Infantry Regiment, 9th Infantry Division when it was deployed to French North Africa in Operation Torch.

In February 1943 he was appointed as Aide-de-camp to General Harold Alexander. For performance of this role he was awarded the Order of the British Empire (MBE).

In November 1943 he was reassigned to the 7th Infantry Regiment, 3rd Infantry Division. In February 1944 he was appointed commander of the 3rd Battalion, 7th Infantry Regiment at Anzio. The 3rd Infantry Division was later withdrawn from Italy and then deployed in Operation Dragoon, the invasion of Southern France in August 1944.

On 7 September 1944 his command post at Besançon was attacked by a German force. Corporal Robert D. Maxwell fell on a German hand grenade absorbing the blast with his body and saving Ramsey from serious injury. Maxwell was later awarded the Medal of Honor for his actions.

In early May 1945 his 3rd Battalion and the 1st Battalion were ordered by regimental commander Colonel John A. Heintges to capture Berchtesgaden, Adolf Hitler’s mountain retreat which they successfully achieved on 4 May. Ramsey initially refused to allow General Philippe Leclerc to cross a bridge into the area until he received confirmation that the 7th Regiment had captured Berchtesgaden.

He was assigned to the Infantry School as an instructor in 1946, he then served with the War Department General Staff. He attended Command and General Staff College in 1949–1950. In 1954 he was appointed as deputy, and later as Secretary, of the Joint Staff of the United Nations Command and Far East Command. In 1957 he was transferred to Fort Benning where he commanded the 14th Infantry Regiment and then the 1st Infantry Brigade. In September 1958 he became the G-1 of the U.S. Army Infantry Center. In July 1959 he was assigned to South Korea and served as the U.S. Army Advisor to the Korean National Defense College until August 1960. He returned to the Department of the Army General Staff in September 1960, serving in the Office of the Chief of Legislative Liaison. In April 1963, he became executive officer of the Office, Assistant Chief of Staff for Force Development. On 1 March 1966 he was appointed Deputy Chief of Information under Brigadier General Keith L. Ware.

In December 1968 he was appointed deputy commander of 1st Logistics Command in South Vietnam.

On 1 June 1969 he was appointed as commander of the 23rd Infantry Division. The Mỹ Lai massacre, conducted by units of the division, became public in November 1969 and he assisted the military commission headed by General William R. Peers in its investigation.

On 17 March 1970 his command and control helicopter crashed into jungle approximately 7 miles (11 km) west of Chu Lai Base Area killing two onboard and wounding him and others. The survivors were eventually rescued 18 hours later. Due to his injuries he was evacuated to the U.S. and replaced as division commander by Major general Albert E. Milloy.

On 14 July 1970 he was appointed United States Army Provost Marshal General and he served in that role until 20 May 1974 when the role was abolished.

He retired from the Army on 1 August 1974.

== Later life ==
He died on 25 February 2016 and was buried in Arlington National Cemetery.

== Decorations ==
His decorations include Distinguished Service Medal (2), Silver Star (3), Legion of Merit (2), Distinguished Flying Cross and Bronze Star (4), Purple Heart (5), Air Medal (17), Gallantry Cross with Palm, Armed Forces Honor Medal First Class, Croix de Guerre and Order of the British Empire.
