= Firebase Hawk Hill =

Site information
- Type: Army

Location
- Coordinates: 15.653°N 108.408°E

Site history
- Built: 1968
- In use: 1968–71
- Battles/wars: Vietnam War

Garrison information
- Occupants: 196th Light Infantry Brigade

Firebase Hawk Hill (also known as Blackhawk Hill, Hill 29, Landing Zone Golden Rose and Landing Zone Porazzo) is a former U.S. Army firebase northwest of Tam Kỳ in Quang Nam Province, central Vietnam.

== History ==
The base was located west of Highway 1, 12 km northwest of Tam Kỳ and 16 km southeast of Landing Zone Baldy.

The 1st Squadron, 1st Cavalry Regiment and the 3rd Battalion, 16th Artillery were based at Hawk Hill in 1968.

The 236th Medical Detachment flying medevac helicopters used Hawk Hill as their main remote site.

SP4 Donald Sloat of the 1st Infantry Regiment operating out of the base would be posthumously awarded the Medal of Honor for his actions on 17 January 1970.

== Current use ==
The area is now a major People's Army of Vietnam base.
