= Battle of Landing Zone Center =

Part of the Vietnam War (1968)

- Part of the Vietnam War
Date	5–25 May 1968
Location	Quảng Tín Province, South Vietnam
Result	U.S. claims victory

Belligerents
United States	North Vietnam

Commanders and leaders
MG Samuel W. Koster	MG Chu Huy Mân; COL Giáp Văn Cương

Units involved
1st Battalion, 6th Infantry; 1st Battalion, 20th Infantry; 1st Squadron, 1st Cavalry	31st Regiment

Casualties and losses
Unknown	US body count: 365 killed

The Battle of Landing Zone Center (also known as the Battle of Hill 352 or the Battle of Nui Hoac Ridge) took place from 5–25 May 1968 in Quảng Tín Province during the Vietnam War.

== Background ==
During the Tet Offensive of 1968, the People's Army of Vietnam (PAVN) 2nd Division tried to capture Đà Nẵng but they were defeated in the Battle of Lo Giang. PAVN Major-General Chu Huy Mân, commander of Military Region 5 ordered Colonel Giáp Văn Cương, commander of the 2nd Division, to split the Division into two fighting arms: one regiment would tie down the Americans in the Quế Son Valley, while the rest of the Division would withdraw to their base areas near Laos, to link up with the 70th Transport Regiment and rest and refit. Then, their next target would be Khâm Đức, the last remaining Special Forces camp adjacent to the Ho Chi Minh Trail in I Corps. Mân told his senior officers that they would attack Khâm Đức to force an American retreat from the area.

In the aftermath of the battle for Đà Nẵng, U.S. military commanders in I Corps held different views on the fighting ability of the PAVN 2nd Division. Americal Division commander Major-General Samuel W. Koster claimed losses sustained by the Division had "impaired its future effectiveness", after his units killed more than 1,000 enemy soldiers in the month of January alone. In contrast, 1st Marine Division commander Major-General Donn J. Robertson told his superiors that the 2nd Division may have several uncommitted units they could deploy for future operations.

== Battle ==
Landing Zone Center (15.585°N 108.249°E) was located on Hill 348, approximately 20km northwest of Tam Kỳ. In early May 1968 it was occupied by 1st Battalion, 6th Infantry Regiment and Battery B, 3rd Battalion, 82nd Artillery Regiment.

On 5 May as part of the May Offensive, the PAVN 31st Regiment attacked LZ Center with mortars and recoilless rifles. When U.S. helicopters tried to land a patrol to locate those weapons, a heavy machine gun company from the PAVN K31 Anti-Aircraft Battalion opened fire from positions around the firebase, shooting down UH-1D #66-17075 from the 176th Assault Helicopter Company which crashed killing all ten crew and passengers and shortly afterwards a helicopter gunship of the 71st Assault Helicopter Company was also shot down. Company D 1st Battalion, 20th Infantry Regiment was flown in to reinforce LZ Center. On 7 May an A–1E Skyraider was shot down while providing air support near LZ Center.

On 8 May Koster ordered the 1st Battalion, 6th Infantry Regiment and the 1st Squadron, 1st Cavalry Regiment to sweep the hills around Landing Zone Center.

The PAVN forces were concentrated on the Nui Hoac Ridge, with their main position located on Hill 352 (15.563°N 108.273°E) approximately 2.5km south of LZ Center. This position held at least two anti-aircraft guns, recoilless rifles, mortars and an unknown number of PAVN. In addition the PAVN were entrenched between Hills 434 and 479 to the east of LZ Center.

On 14 May 1968 during an attack on PAVN bunkers on Hill 352 Platoon sergeant Finnis D. McCleery of 1st Platoon, Company A, 1/6th Infantry single-handedly attacked and destroyed several PAVN bunkers despite being wounded twice. For his actions that day, McCleery would be awarded the Medal of Honor.

== Aftermath ==
The battle was a U.S. victory with the US claiming over 365 PAVN were killed, however it diverted U.S. resources away from the Battle of Kham Duc.
