= Jesse R. Drowley =

United States Army soldier

Jesse Ray Drowley
- Born: September 9, 1919; St. Charles, Michigan
- Died: May 20, 1996 (aged 76); Spokane, Washington
- Burial place: Fairmount Memorial Park, Spokane, Washington
- Military career
- Allegiance: United States of America
- Branch: United States Army
- Rank: Staff Sergeant
- Units: Company B, 1st Battalion, 132nd Infantry Regiment, Americal Division
- Conflicts: World War II
- Awards: Medal of Honor

Jesse Ray Drowley (September 9, 1919 – May 20, 1996) was a United States Army soldier and a recipient of the United States military's highest decoration—the Medal of Honor—for his actions in World War II.

== Life and career ==
Drowley joined the Army from Spokane, Washington, and by January 30, 1944, was serving as a staff sergeant in the Americal Division 132nd Inf. 1st Batt. Comp. B . On that day, on Bougainville in the Solomon Islands, he discovered an enemy bunker which was firing on attacking American troops. He ran across open terrain to reach a friendly tank, climbed on board, and personally led them towards the bunker. Although twice wounded while on the tank, he refused medical evacuation until the bunker was destroyed. For these actions, he was awarded the Medal of Honor eight months later, by President Franklin Roosevelt in the White House on September 6, 1944.

Drowley died at age 76 and was buried in Fairmount Memorial Park, Spokane, Washington.

== Medal of Honor citation ==
Staff Sergeant Drowley's official Medal of Honor citation reads:

For gallantry and intrepidity at the risk of his life above and beyond the call of duty in action with the enemy at Bougainville, Solomon Islands, 30 January 1944. S/Sgt. Drowley, a squad leader in a platoon whose mission during an attack was to remain under cover while holding the perimeter defense and acting as a reserve for assaulting echelon, saw 3 members of the assault company fall badly wounded. When intense hostile fire prevented aid from reaching the casualties, he fearlessly rushed forward to carry the wounded to cover. After rescuing 2 men, S/Sgt. Drowley discovered an enemy pillbox undetected by assaulting tanks that was inflicting heavy casualties upon the attacking force and was a chief obstacle to the success of the advance. Delegating the rescue of the third man to an assistant, he ran across open terrain to 1 of the tanks. Signaling to the crew, he climbed to the turret, exchanged his weapon for a submachine gun and voluntarily rode the deck of the tank directing it toward the pillbox by tracer fire. The tank, under constant heavy enemy fire, continued to within 20 feet of the pillbox where S/Sgt. Drowley received a severe bullet wound in the chest. Refusing to return for medical treatment, he remained on the tank and continued to direct its progress until the enemy box was definitely located by the crew. At this point he again was wounded by small arms fire, losing his left eye and falling to the ground. He remained alongside the tank until the pillbox had been completely demolished and another directly behind the first destroyed. S/Sgt. Drowley, his voluntary mission successfully accomplished, returned alone for medical treatment.

== Awards and decorations ==

Badge	Combat Infantryman Badge		
1st row	Medal of Honor		
2nd row	Bronze Star Medal with 1 oak leaf cluster	Purple Heart with 1 oak leaf cluster	Army Good Conduct Medal
3rd row	American Campaign Medal	Asiatic-Pacific Campaign Medal with one campaign star	World War II Victory Medal

== See also ==
- List of Medal of Honor recipients
- List of Medal of Honor recipients for World War II
