= Fire support base =

Temporary military facility

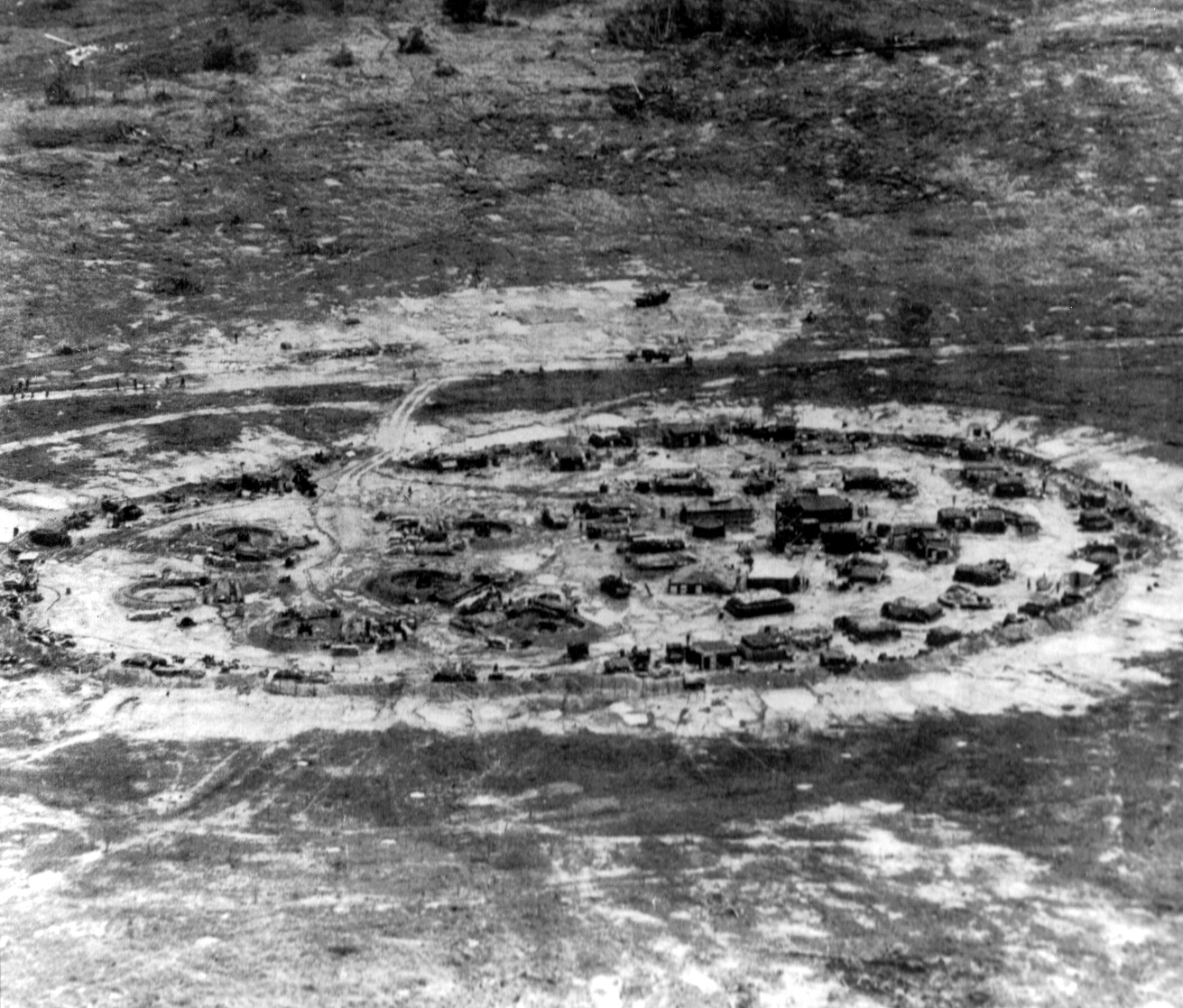
Fire support base Crook, Vietnam, 1969

A fire support base (FSB, firebase or FB) is a temporary military facility used to provide fire support (often in the form of artillery) to infantry operating in areas beyond the normal range of fire support from their own base camps. FSBs follow a number of plans, their shape and construction varying based on the terrain they occupy and the projected garrison.

Widely used during the Vietnam War, the concept continues to be used in military operations. Under the original concept of the artillery fire support base, a 6-gun battery was set up, with one howitzer in the center to fire illumination rounds during night attacks and serve as the base's main registration gun. The other five howitzers were arranged around it in a "star" pattern. Smaller FSBs tended to vary greatly from this layout, with two to four howitzers of various calibers (usually 105 mm and 155 mm at battalion level) located in dispersed and fortified firing positions. These smaller bases arranged their guns in square or triangle patterns when possible.

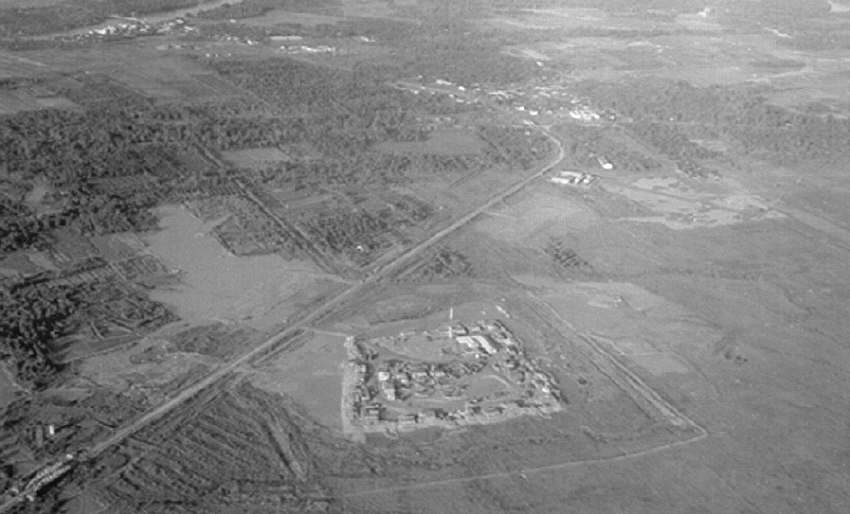
Fire Support Base Danger, headquarters of 4/39th Infantry of the 9th U.S. Infantry Division, Dinh Tuong Province, Vietnam, 1969.

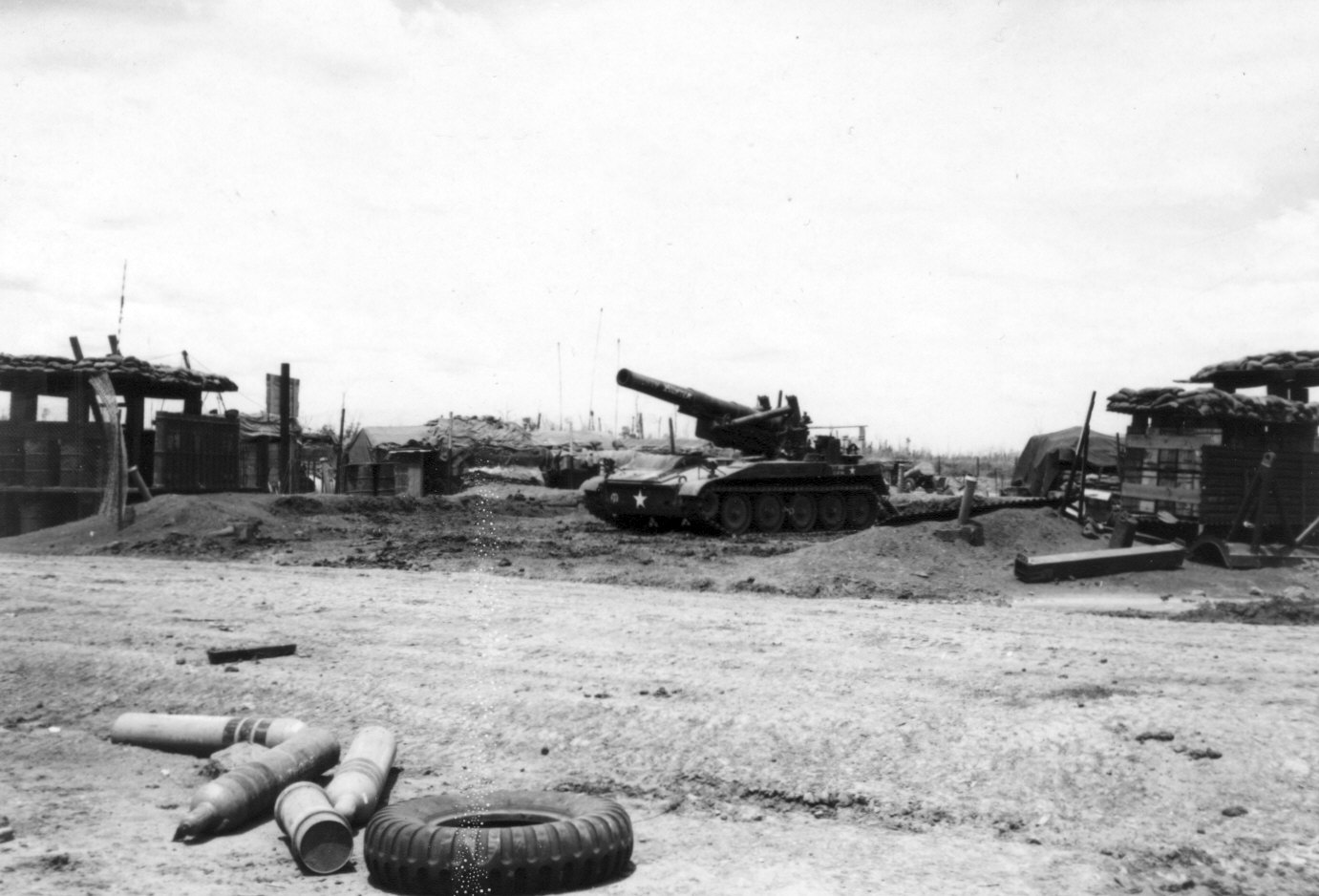
FSB, 23rd Artillery Group, Vietnam, 1971

== Vietnam War ==
One of the first fire support bases constructed by U.S. troops was built in October 1965. Designated Bill, it was built by the First Cavalry Division in Pleiku Province soon after the division arrived in South Vietnam. Based on the original concept developed by that division, firebases would move about every two days, minimizing the amount of security and semi-permanent construction they would need. Over time this changed, and firebases evolved into small forts with all the defensive measures those required.

Many fire support bases evolved into more permanent bases. Their main components varied by size: a typical FSB usually had a battery of six 105 millimeter or 155 mm howitzers, a platoon of engineers permanently on station for construction and maintenance projects, at least two landing pads for helicopters (a smaller VIP pad and at least one resupply pad), a Tactical Operations Center (TOC), an aid station staffed with medics, a communications bunker, and a company of infantry serving as the defense garrison. Large FSBs might also have 2 artillery batteries, and an infantry battalion.

Firebase Bastogne was a United States firebase constructed in Vietnam in 1968 by the 101st Airborne Division. Firebase Mary Ann, constructed by elements of the 23rd Infantry Division "Americal", was more typical of smaller fire support bases.

== Use in Afghanistan ==
Firebases had been set up in Afghanistan since the action by U.S.-led Coalition forces began in 2001. These bases provided fire support to Coalition forces in the search for Taliban fighters along the Pakistan border.

- Kunar Province
  - Firebase Phoenix

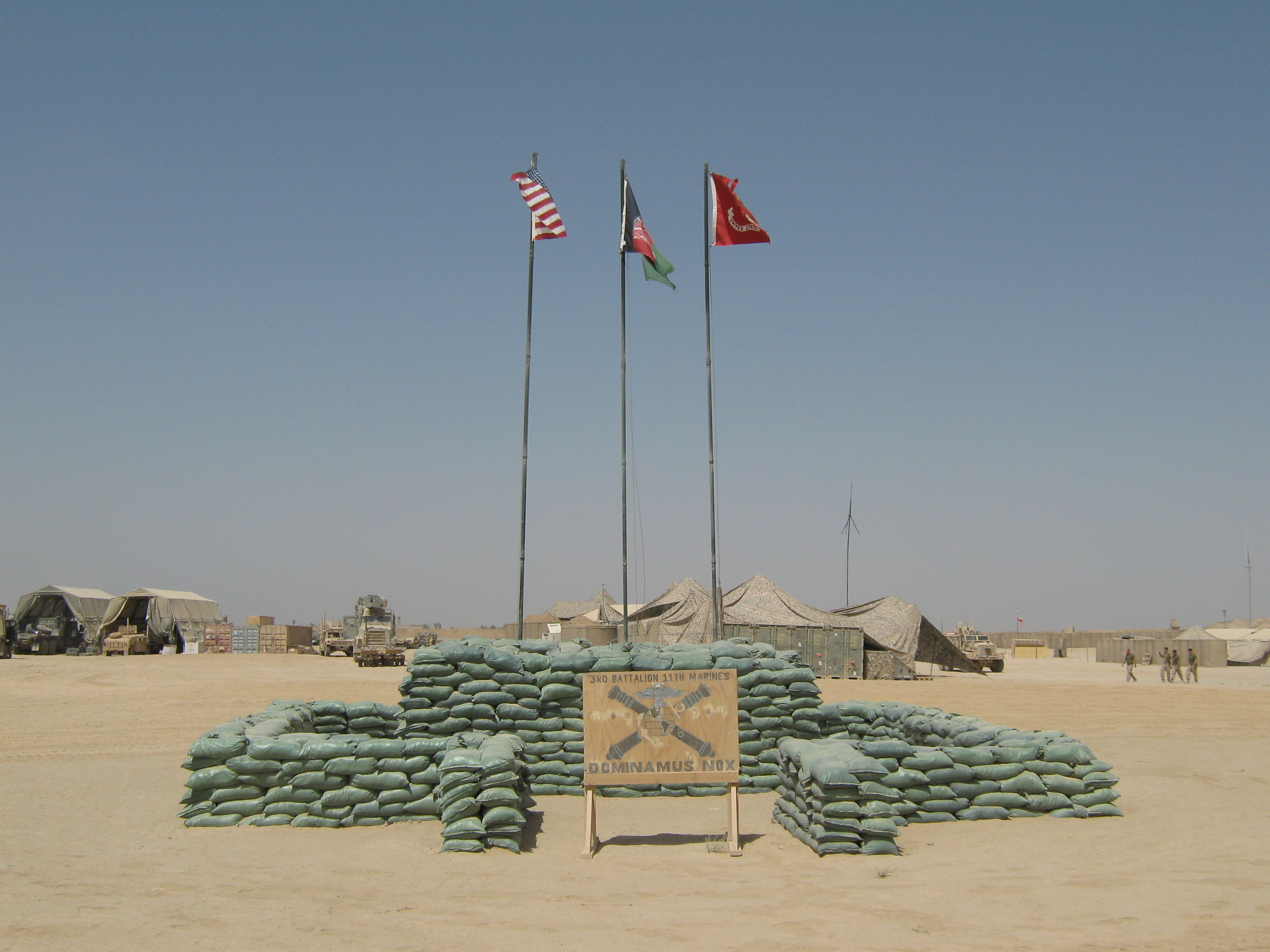
Fiddler's Green

- Helmand Province
  - Firebase Fiddler's Green
- Nangarhar Province
  - A former firebase - Forward Operating Base Torkham
- Firebase Thomas
- Firebase Tinsley near Char Chiehna. Formerly FOB Cobra.

== See also ==
- Forward operating base
- Hedgehog defense
