= James L. Baldwin =

United States Army officer, commander of the 23rd Infantry Division

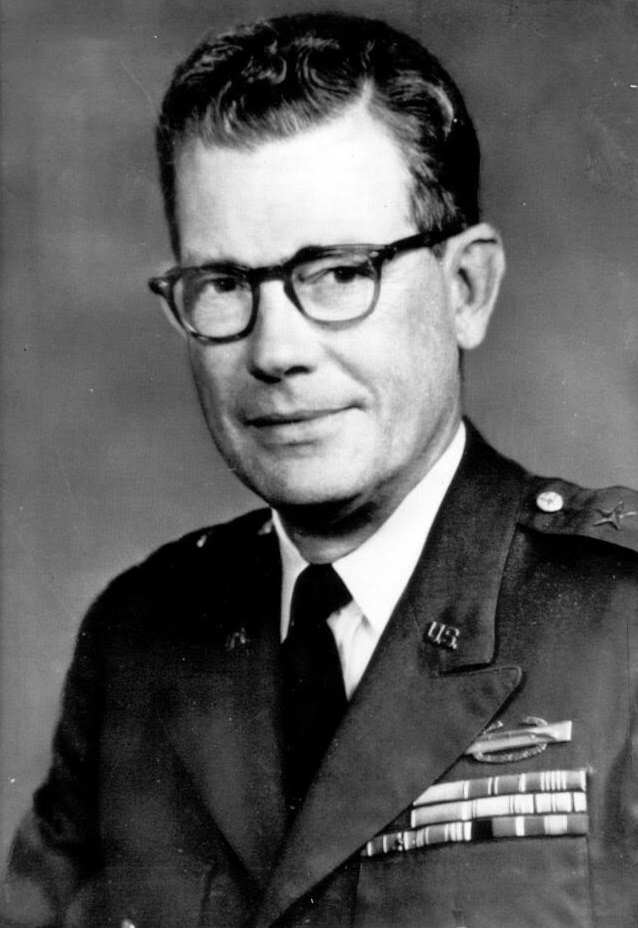
- Major General James L. Baldwin as commander of the 23rd (Americal) Infantry Division during the Vietnam War.
- Born: February 28, 1921; Omaha, Nebraska, US
- Died: November 8, 1979 (aged 58); River Falls, Wisconsin, US
- Burial place: Arlington National Cemetery
- Military career
- Allegiance: United States of America
- Branch: United States Army
- Service years: 1939–1972
- Rank: Major General
- Commands: 1st Battalion, 21st Infantry Regiment; 3rd Brigade, 4th Armored Division; Berlin Brigade; 23rd (Americal) Infantry Division
- Conflicts: World War II; Korean War; Vietnam War
- Awards: Combat Infantryman Badge; Legion of Merit; Bronze Star; Purple Heart; Army Commendation Medal
- Other work: Foreign Policy Consultant, U.S. State Department

Major General James Leon Baldwin (February 28, 1921 – November 8, 1979) was a career United States Army officer who served as commander of the 23rd (Americal) Infantry Division from 1970 to 1971.

== Early life and start of career ==
James Leon Baldwin was born in Omaha, Nebraska on February 28, 1921. He attended schools in Wichita and Ness City, Kansas and graduated from high school in Ness City in 1938.

Baldwin attended Kansas State Teachers College from 1938 to 1939, and enlisted in the National Guard in 1939. When National Guard units started to be federalized in anticipation of World War II, he served with the 35th Division in Arkansas and California until attending Officer Candidate School in 1942.

== World War II ==
After receiving his commission Baldwin served in Europe with the 99th Infantry Division during World War II, taking part in the Battle of the Bulge, Rhineland, and Central Europe campaigns. While serving as Intelligence Staff Officer, S-2 for the 395th Infantry Regiment, Baldwin investigated the massacre by German soldiers of 11 African-American members of the 333rd Artillery Battalion, who had been killed after they surrendered.

== Post-World War II ==
Baldwin remained in the Army after the war, serving in West Germany with the 16th Infantry Regiment of the 1st Infantry Division, including an assignment as regimental Plans, Operations and Training Officer, S-3.

== Korean War ==
During the Korean War Baldwin, by now a lieutenant colonel, commanded 1st Battalion, 21st Infantry Regiment, a unit of the 24th Infantry Division. He later served as the division's assistant chief of staff for personnel, G-1.

== Post-Korean War ==
In 1954 Baldwin received a Bachelor of Arts degree from George Washington University. He graduated from the Army Command and General Staff College in 1955, and undertook graduate studies at Columbia University from 1957 to 1958.

From 1958 to 1961 Baldwin served in the International Plans and Policy Division of the Army's Deputy Chief of Staff for Operations, G-3. In 1962 he graduated from the National War College.

Baldwin was assigned as Executive Officer in the Office of the Secretary of the Army from 1962 to 1964. From 1964 to 1966 he served as Commander of 3rd Brigade 4th Armored Division.

In 1966 Baldwin, now a Brigadier General, served as the 4th Armored Division's Assistant Division Commander for Support. Later in 1966 he took command of the Berlin Brigade, where he served until late 1967.

From 1967 to 1968 Baldwin was director of plans and programs for the Army's Assistant Chief of Staff for Force Development and from 1968 to 1970 he was Director of Force Planning Analysis for the Vice Chief of Staff of the Army.

== Vietnam War ==
In July, 1970 Baldwin was assigned as Deputy Commander of the XXIV Corps in Vietnam. In November, 1970 he was assigned as Commander of the 23rd (Americal) Infantry Division. He commanded the division until July, 1971, when he was reassigned.

Baldwin was removed from command and received a letter of admonishment as the result of the attack on Fire Support Base Mary Ann. The Commander of the 196th Light Infantry Brigade, Colonel William Hathaway, was removed from the promotion list for Brigadier General and received a letter of reprimand. The commander of 1st Battalion 46th Infantry, Lieutenant Colonel William P. Doyle, also received a letter of reprimand. All three commanders received these reprimands for not having ensured that standard operating procedures were followed with regard to perimeter security at FSB Mary Ann, thus facilitating the attack.

Baldwin, Hathaway and Doyle protested their reprimands, but they were upheld by General William Westmoreland, then the Army Chief of Staff. Westmoreland and the Commander in Vietnam, Creighton Abrams, wanted Baldwin reduced in rank to Brigadier General, and for him to receive a letter of reprimand. They were overruled by Secretary of the Army Robert Froehlke, and Baldwin received the less severe letter of admonishment and no reduction in rank.

== Post-Vietnam War ==
Baldwin served as an assistant to the Army's Deputy Chief of Staff for Logistics, G-4 before retiring in 1972.

== Awards and decorations ==
Baldwin's awards included the Combat Infantryman Badge, Legion of Merit, Bronze Star, Purple Heart and Army Commendation Medal.

== Later career ==
After retiring in 1972, Baldwin resided in Arlington, Virginia and was a consultant on foreign policy for the United States Department of State.

== Death and burial ==
He died in River Falls, Wisconsin on November 8, 1979. He is buried at Arlington National Cemetery, Section 60, Site 645.

== Family ==
Baldwin married Margaret Albright of Wisconsin in 1945. They had met in Germany during World War II when Margaret was employed by the American Red Cross. They had three sons – Robert, Timothy and John, and a daughter, Margaret.

Baldwin's surviving children, especially his son Timothy, later conducted research on the FSB Mary Ann attack in an effort to clear their father's name.

== Cited in The Generals ==
In Thomas Ricks’ 2012 book The Generals he cites Baldwin's removal from division command and letter of admonishment as the last instance of a US Army general being held accountable for combat ineffectiveness, as opposed to being punished for personal failings such as adultery. Ricks contrasts Baldwin's removal and the World War II relief of corps and division commanders who proved ineffective (many of whom performed well when given second chances) with the wars in Iraq and Afghanistan. In the post-Vietnam Army, Ricks argues that a culture of mediocrity exists because generals may be punished for personal misconduct, but are not held accountable for poor job performance.
