= Edmund Sebree =

United States Army general

Edmund Bower Sebree
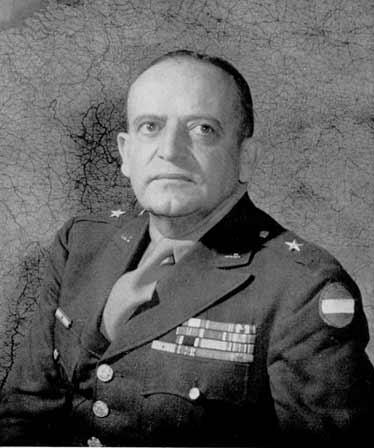
- Born: January 7, 1898; Olney, Illinois, United States
- Died: June 25, 1966 (aged 68); Fort Ord, California, United States
- Burial place: San Francisco National Cemetery
- Military career
- Allegiance: United States
- Branch: United States Army
- Service years: 1917–1957
- Rank: Major General
- Service number: 0-12376
- Unit: Infantry Branch
- Commands: Americal Division; 5th Armored Division; 7th Infantry Division
- Conflicts: World War I World War II; Korean War
- Awards: Army Distinguished Service Medal (2); Legion of Merit; Silver Star (2); Bronze Star

Major General Edmund Bower Sebree (January 7, 1898 – June 25, 1966) was a senior United States Army officer who commanded U.S. Army forces during World War II and Korean War.

== Early life ==
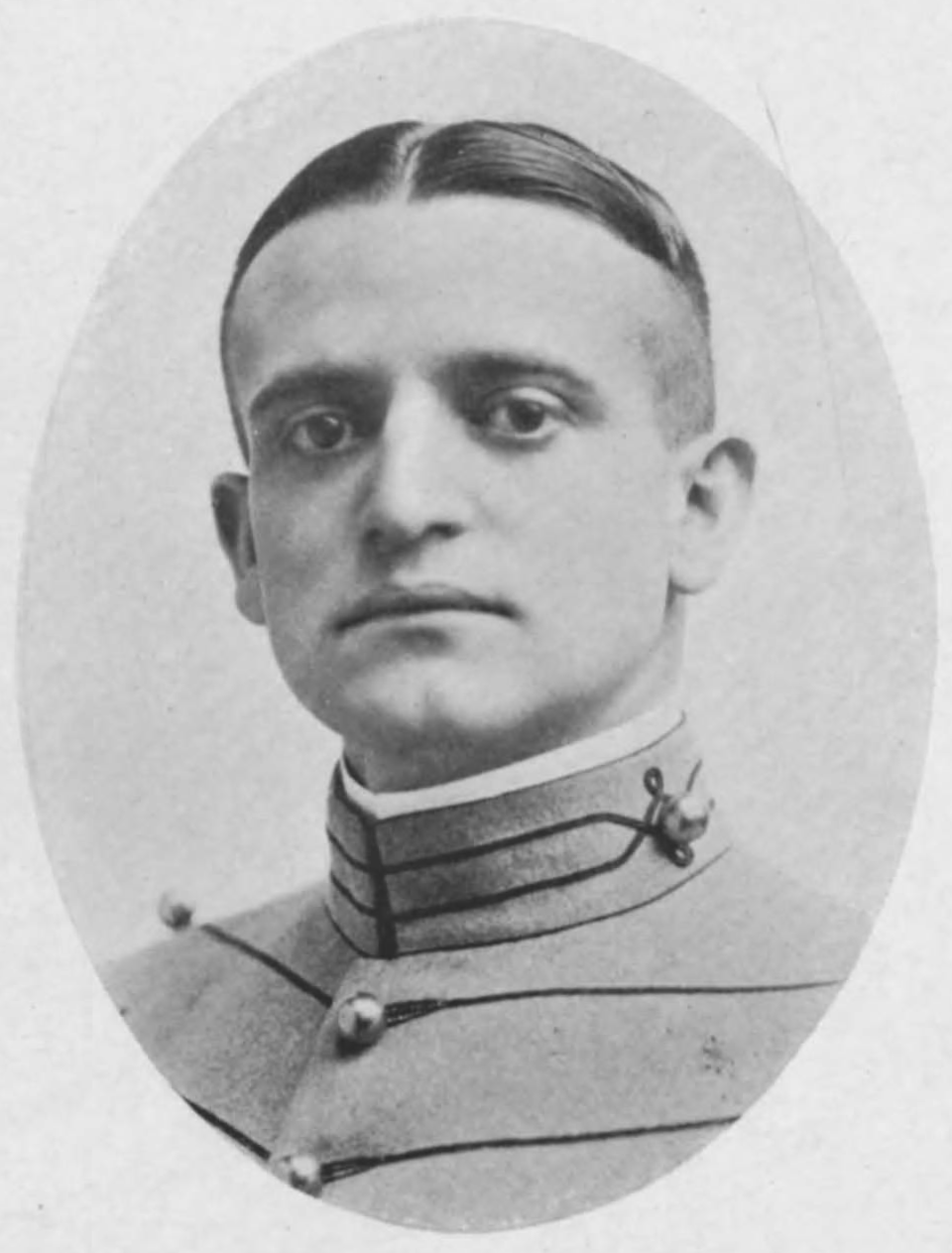
As a West Point cadet

Sebree was born on January 7, 1898, in the city of Olney, Illinois, as a son of Milton Eddy and Catella (Bower) Sebree. He attended a Cornell University in New York and after one year, Sebree was transferred to the United States Military Academy at West Point. He was commissioned as infantry second lieutenant on November 1, 1918.

His first assignment was with American Expeditionary Forces during occupation duties in Weimar Germany in 1919. After return from the Europe, Sebree attended a training course at United States Army Infantry School at Fort Benning and then, in 1920, Sebree was assigned to the 3rd Infantry Regiment at Chilkoot Barracks, Alaska, where he spent next three years.

Following a service between the years 1923–1928 with 21st Infantry Regiment at Vancouver Barracks, Washington and with 31st Infantry Regiment at Manila, Philippine Islands, Sebree was appointed a professor of military science and tactics at Western Military Academy in Alton, Illinois.

After four years at Western Military Academy, Sebree was transferred back to the Philippine Islands, where he was assigned to the 45th Infantry Regiment. In 1936, newly promoted Captain Sebree was ordered back to States, where he attended a special officers course at Command and General Staff School at Fort Leavenworth, Kansas. After completion of course, Captain Sebree was appointed an Aide to Major general Herbert J. Brees, commander of VIII Corps at Fort Sam Houston, Texas.

Sebree spent over three years in that capacity and in 1940, he was transferred to the staff of the 9th Infantry Division under command of Major General Jacob L. Devers. But Sebree spent there only few months and was subsequently transferred to the personnel division of the War Department General Staff.

== World War II ==
During the strategically significant Guadalcanal Campaign in 1942, Sebree was assigned to the Americal Division under command of Major General Alexander Patch, as its assistant division commander. Sebree assumed command of entire Americal Division at the beginning of the January, 1943, when Major General Patch was appointed a commander of the XIV Corps.

Briefly commanded the Americal Division units engaged with Japanese forces for control of the island. Following the Guadalcanal Campaign, General Sebree was returned to the U.S. to train and deploy with Major General Paul W. Baade's 35th Infantry Division, serving as its Assistant Division Commander (ADC). During the Lorraine Campaign, Sebree led an independent task force of infantry and armored units with artillery and supporting arms in the liberation of Nancy. After the war, he served as the first Defense Attache to Australia. He was also the commander of TRUST (TRieste United States Troops) in the Free Territory of Trieste.

== Later life and death ==
Edmund Sebree died in Fort Ord, California on June 25, 1966, and was buried at San Francisco National Cemetery.

== Decorations ==
Ribbon bar with the list of Sebree's decorations:

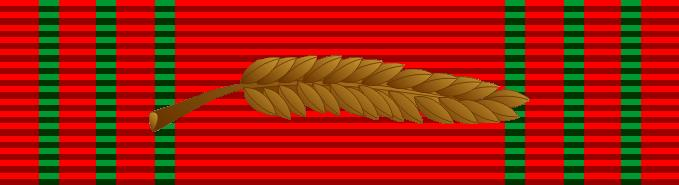

1st Row		Army Distinguished Service Medal w/ Oak Leaf Cluster	Silver Star w/ Oak Leaf Cluster	
2nd Row	Legion of Merit	Bronze Star	Purple Heart	World War I Victory Medal
3rd Row	Army of Occupation of Germany Medal	American Defense Service Medal	American Campaign Medal	Asiatic-Pacific Campaign Medal w/ one service star
4th Row	European-African-Middle Eastern Campaign Medal w/ three service stars	World War II Victory Medal	Army of Occupation Medal w/ Germany Clasp	National Defense Service Medal
5th Row	Korean Service Medal	United Nations Korea Medal	Officer of the Legion of Honour	Belgian Croix de guerre with Palm

== Sources ==
=== Books ===
- Frank, Richard (1990). Guadalcanal: The Definitive Account of the Landmark Battle. New York: Random House. ISBN 0-394-58875-4.
- Griffith, Samuel B. (1966) [1963]. The Battle for Guadalcanal (1st ed.). New York: Ballantine Books. OCLC 2362805.
- Hammel, Eric (2007). Guadalcanal: The U.S. Marines in World War II. St. Paul, Minnesota, USA: Zenith Press. ISBN 978-0-7603-3148-4.
- Jersey, Stanley Coleman (2008). Hell's Islands: The Untold Story of Guadalcanal. College Station, Texas: Texas A&M University Press. ISBN 978-1-58544-616-2.
- Morison, Samuel Eliot (1958). The Struggle for Guadalcanal, August 1942 – February 1943, vol. 5 of History of United States Naval Operations in World War II. Boston: Little, Brown and Company. ISBN 0-316-58305-7.

=== Web ===
- Ammentorp, Steen (2007). "Sebree, Edmund Bower, Major-General". The Generals of WWII.
- Hough, Frank O.; Ludwig, Verle E.; Shaw, Henry I. Jr. "Pearl Harbor to Guadalcanal". History of U.S. Marine Corps Operations in World War II.
- Miller, John Jr. (1995) [1949]. Guadalcanal: The First Offensive. United States Army Center of Military History. CMH Pub 5-3. Archived from the original on December 25, 2007.
- Shaw, Henry I. (1992). "First Offensive: The Marine Campaign For Guadalcanal". Marines in World War II Commemorative Series.
- Zimmerman, John L. (1949). "The Guadalcanal Campaign". Marines in World War II Historical Monograph.

Military offices
Preceded by Alexander Patch	Commanding General 23rd Infantry Division; January 1943 – May 1943	Succeeded by John R. Hodge
Preceded by ??	Commanding General 5th Armored Division; 1952–1953	Succeeded by ??
Preceded by Lionel C. McGarr	Commanding General 7th Infantry Division; 1954–1955	Succeeded by Paul Caraway
