= Albert E. Milloy =

U.S. Army officier

Albert Ernest Milloy
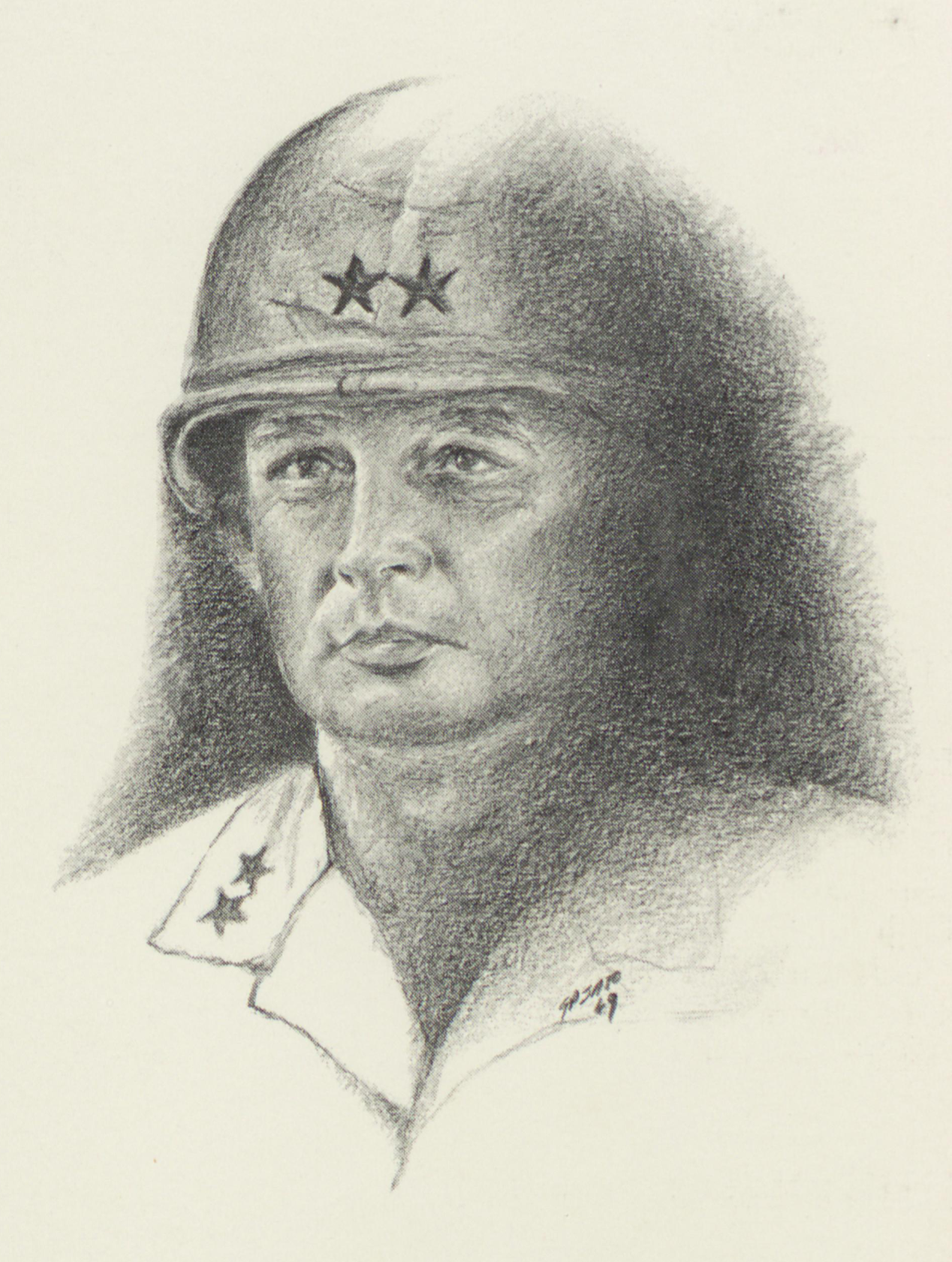
- Pencil sketch of Milloy as commander of 1st Infantry Division
- Born: 25 November 1921; Hattiesburg, Mississippi
- Died: 3 June 2012 (aged 90); Henderson, Nevada
- Burial place: Arlington National Cemetery
- Military career
- Allegiance: United States of America
- Branch: United States Army
- Service years: 1938–1975
- Rank: Major general
- Nickname: Ernie
- Commands: John F. Kennedy Special Warfare Center and School; 1st Infantry Division; 23rd Infantry Division
- Conflicts: World War II; Korean War; Vietnam War
- Awards: Distinguished Service Medal; Silver Star (3); Legion of Merit (2); Distinguished Flying Cross; Bronze Star (3); Combat Infantryman Badge (3)

Signature
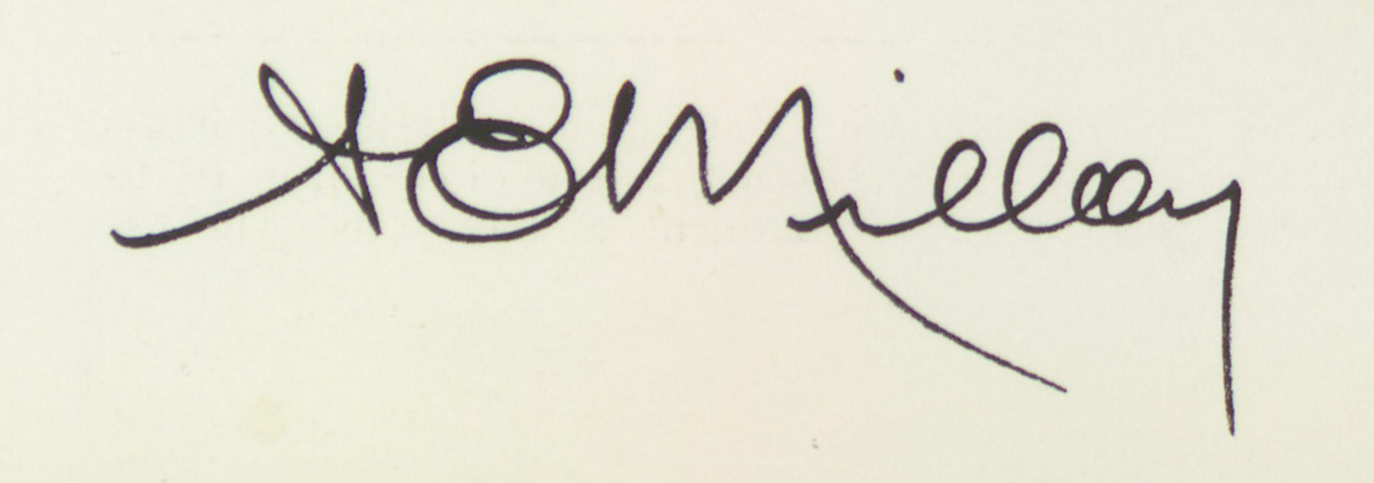

Major General Albert E. Milloy (25 November 1921 – 3 June 2012) was a United States Army officer who served in World War II, the Korean War and the Vietnam War.

== Early life ==
He was born on 25 November 1921 in Hattiesburg, Mississippi. He grew up in Hattiesburg and attended Hattiesburg High School.

== Military career ==
Milloy began his military career in 1938 when he enlisted in the U.S. Army at the age of 17 as a private, serving in the Mississippi National Guard

In 1940 he was assisting a relative in running a Dr. Pepper bottling plant in Louisiana when he was asked to assist in standing up a new regular army unit. Milloy would subsequently serve as an infantry platoon leader in Camp Blanding, Florida, prior to the U.S. entering World War II in 1941.

During World War II, he served in the 504th Parachute Infantry Regiment. Seeing action in the Mediterranean and Western European Theater, Milloy would serve as the commander of Company C, 504th PIR, seeing combat in Italy, France, the Netherlands, and Germany. He would conduct three combat jumps with the 82nd Airborne Division, and be awarded the Silver Star for actions in Altavilla Silentina, Italy.

During the Korean War, he served as a major in the 2nd Infantry Division. Commanding the 2nd Battalion of the 38th Regiment, he led his men through the Chinese spring offensive, the Punchbowl, and Heartbreak Ridge, and be awarded two more Silver Stars.

He commanded the 2nd Brigade, 1st Infantry Division, in South Vietnam in early 1966, leading it in Operation Mastiff and Operation Mallett.

He served as commander of the John F. Kennedy Special Warfare Center and School from 1966 to 1968.

On 10 August 1969, at a ceremony at Dĩ An, Milloy assumed command of the 1st Infantry Division in South Vietnam, becoming the division's 41st commanding general. He led the division until its departure from South Vietnam on 4 April 1970. He rejected the idea of a divisional farewell march from Lai Khê to Long Binh Post; instead, the division carved a 1.5-mile-long (2.4 km) by 1-mile-wide (1.6 km) numeral 1 into the jungle east of the Michelin Rubber Plantation.

On 21 March 1970 he was appointed commander of the 23rd Infantry Division, replacing Major General Lloyd B. Ramsey, who had been injured in a helicopter crash. He served as commander until November 1970. During this time, he dealt with the aftermath of the Mỹ Lai massacre, which had been conducted by units of the division. He advised congressional investigators that Mỹ Lai was insecure and infested with mines and booby traps. He was later described by his subordinate Norman Schwarzkopf as "the kind of muddy-boots commander I admired."

Milloy would finish his career as the U.S. Army Chief of Staff at the Presidio of San Francisco, retiring in 1975.

== Later life ==
Following his retirement he would work as a licensed general contractor in California, owning several small businesses.

He died on 3 June 2012 and was buried in Arlington National Cemetery.

== Personal life ==
Milloy was married to Lorraine Baker of Birmingham, Alabama, and they had four children.

== Decorations ==
His decorations include the Distinguished Service Medal (2), Silver Star (3), Legion of Merit (2), Distinguished Flying Cross, Bronze Star (3) Purple Heart (2) and Air Medal (20).
