= Americal Division =

1942–1971 United States Army formation

- Americal Division shoulder sleeve insignia
- Active: 27 May 1942 — 12 December 1945; 1 December 1954 — 10 April 1956; 25 September 1967 — 29 November 1971
- Country: United States
- Branch: United States Army
- Type: Infantry
- Size: Division
- Part of: Regular Army
- Nickname: Americal
- Colors: Blue and white
- Engagements: World War II; Guadalcanal; Northern Solomons; Leyte; Southern Philippines; Vietnam
- Decorations: Presidential Unit Citation; Valorous Unit Award; Meritorious Unit Commendation; Philippine Presidential Unit Citation; Republic of Vietnam Gallantry Cross with Palm Unit Citation (2); Republic of Vietnam Civil Actions with Palm Unit Citation

Commanders
- Notable commanders: MG Alexander M. Patch, Jr. BG Edmund Sebree; MG John R. Hodge; MG Robert B. McClure; MG William H. Arnold; MG Samuel W. Koster; MG James L. Baldwin; MG Frederick J. Kroesen

Insignia
- Distinctive unit insignia

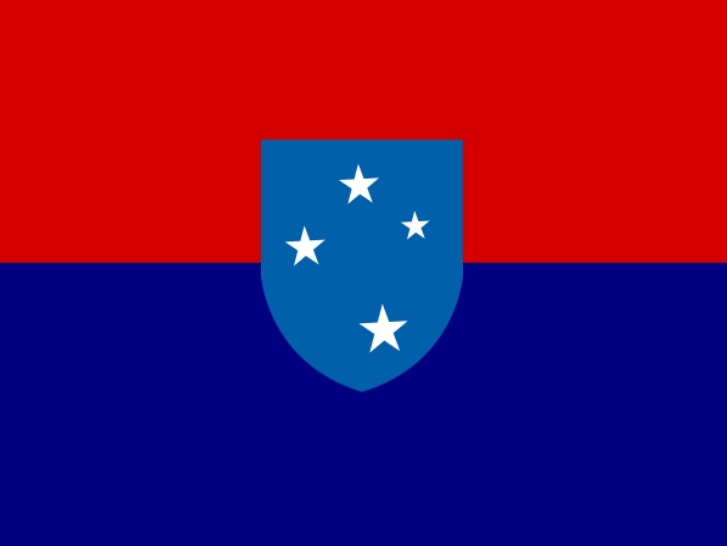
- Flag

The 23rd Infantry Division, also known as the Americal Division, was an infantry division of the United States Army during World War II from 1942 to 1945, briefly in the mid 1950s and the Vietnam War from 1967-71. The division was activated 27 May 1942 on the island of New Caledonia in the Southwest Pacific Ocean. In the immediate emergency following Pearl Harbor, the United States had hurriedly sent a task force to defend New Caledonia against a feared Japanese attack. This division was the only division formed outside of the United States during World War II (a distinction it would repeat when reformed in 1967).

At the suggestion of a subordinate, the division's commander, Major General Alexander Patch, requested that the new unit be known as the Americal Division—the name being a contraction of "American, New Caledonian Division". This was unusual, as with the exception of the Philippine Division, all other active U.S. divisions were known by a number. After World War II the Americal Division was officially re-designated as the 23rd Infantry Division. However, it was rarely referred to as such, even on official orders.

During the Vietnam War, the division had a mixed record. It combined participation in numerous battles and campaigns but gained notoriety and infamy due to the My Lai massacre, which was committed by a platoon of the division's subordinate 20th Infantry Regiment, under the 11th Infantry Brigade, led by 1st Lieutenant William Calley. The division suffered a tactical defeat in the early morning of 28 March 1971, when Viet Cong sappers assaulted FSB Mary Ann. The attack destroyed key infrastructure, as well as killing 33 and wounding 83 Americans. The division was inactivated following its withdrawal from South Vietnam in November 1971.

== History ==
=== World War II ===
==== Task Force 6814 ====
New Caledonia, a likely target for the Japanese for its critical strategic position on the lines of communication with New Zealand and Australia and its nickel and chromium mines, was now under the control of the Free French with a poorly equipped and trained native force and a company of Australian commandos. The United States Army was already building airfields with Australian labor on the island which according to early agreements fell into the British sphere and delegated to the Australians for defense. The French objected to the arrangement and, increasingly worried about Japanese invasion being attracted by the airfield, demanded additional American forces.

With pressing needs to build up defenses in Hawaii and Australia, Army planners decided to put together a force rather than commit an already organized division. Two regiments available due to the reorganization of the "square" divisions of the National Guard to the triangular division Table of Organization and Equipment (TO&E) were chosen for deployment to New Caledonia: 132nd Infantry Regiment from Illinois, formerly part of the 33rd Infantry Division and the 182nd Infantry Regiment from Massachusetts, formerly part of the 26th Infantry Division. This force, designated Task Force 6814 and often mentioned as Poppy Force (New Caledonia was code named Poppy), under Brigadier General Alexander M. Patch, Jr. had the elements of a division and fielded about 15,000 men. Task Force 6814 was activated at the New York Port of Embarkation on 14 January 1942 and included a brigade headquarters from the 26th Division, two infantry regiments and a field artillery regiment along with support elements augmented by a battalion of light tanks, anti-aircraft and coast artillery regiments and a pursuit squadron. The force's mission was to hold New Caledonia. It was an independent command, directly under the War Department in Washington.

Within two weeks, despite an urgent need of shipping elsewhere and at the cost of delaying and rearranging schedules elsewhere and consultations at the head of state level, Task Force 6814 along with some 4,000 troops destined for Australia were assembled in the largest single troop convoy up until that time, designated BT-200 and totaling over 20,000 troops aboard seven transports,. (Note: The transports were: Argentina (1929) 20,614 GRT, Cristobal (1939) 10,021 GRT, USAT J . W. McAndrew (1940) 7,997 GRT, John Ericsson (1928) 16,552 GRT, Santa Elena (1933) 9,135 GRT, Santa Rosa (1932) 9,135 GRT and USAT Thomas H. Barry (1930) 11,250 GRT.) The convoy sailed from the New York on 23 January 1942 (Note: The date commonly given. Some sources, particularly Leighton & Coakley, state "cleared New York Harbor late on the 22d" so it is possible there is some confusion in GMT/local time references.) and reached Melbourne on 26 February.

This large and critical convoy was covered by a striking group and long range air between its intended position and Japanese forces arranged by Admiral King (COMINCH) with Admiral Nimitz (CINCPAC). Despite some desire locally to use the force to reinforce Australia or the Netherlands East Indies, under direct orders from Washington the force moved secretly, not even informing the French, to New Caledonia. Transshipment of troops and equipment was completed in Melbourne and the seven transports departed on 7 March (Australian time) for New Caledonia as convoy ZK-7, arriving at Noumea six days later. General Patch, preceding the force by air, had arrived on 5 March with news for the French that American forces were underway. Despite having no early prospect of reinforcements, another infantry regiment arrived in April, along with the authority to organize an infantry division from elements of the overall force and, in May, the Americal Division was organized.

On 14 March 1942, two days after the task force later to be known as the Americal Division landed in Nouméa, New Caledonia, the 182nd Infantry was detailed to provide a special unit to be called Force A for advance occupation and outposting of the New Hebrides, a group of islands lying directly astride the supply route to the United States. Assigned to this duty were Companies L and M and attached elements from Headquarters Company, Service Company, and the Medical Detachment, plus a platoon of the 101st Engineers. The total of around 480 men was under the command of Brigadier General Rose. That a brigadier general should be placed in command of two infantry rifle companies indicated the degree of importance and hazard that G.H.Q. placed upon the mission, but mainly it was so that Rose had authority to deal directly with the highest local French authorities.

The men were assembled and told that Force A and 50 Australians held the most advanced outpost of the Allied Forces in the South Pacific along with Australian forces at Port Moresby, Papua. No retreat was possible, no reinforcements could be relied on. Supply was unreliable and limited. On 28 March 1942, a unit of Force A left an isolated coconut plantation called Euralia for Port Havanah with two 2nd lieutenants and 22 men on a small auxiliary sailboat with equipment and 10 days' rations to begin their 'guerrilla' action by gathering the native headhunters and plantation workers from the nearby islands as reinforcements.

On 19 April 1942, the 164th Infantry Regiment from North Dakota, formerly part of the 34th Infantry Division, arrived in New Caledonia to reinforce Task Force 6814. Additional field artillery units also arrived about that time.

==== Division formation ====
On 27 May 1942, Task Force 6814 was reorganized and constituted in the Army of the United States as the Americal Division, the only US Army division not designated by number. The Americal derived its name from the phrase, "American Troops on New Caledonia".

==== Guadalcanal ====
In contrast to several other US Army divisions in the Pacific War, soldiers in the Americal Division received extensive weapons training as well as company- and battalion-level exercises in jungle terrain while at New Caledonia. Under the command of General Patch, the Americal Division was the first US Army unit to be sent to Guadalcanal. Largely because of transport constraints, the Americal arrived piecemeal and was fed into combat alongside the battle-hardened and exhausted US 1st Marine Division, which it eventually relieved. Its soldiers were quick to assimilate from the Marines on Guadalcanal lessons on battle tactics against Japanese forces. Americal casualties were consequently less than what might be expected.

The 164th Infantry Regiment landed on Guadalcanal on 13 October 1942 ahead of its brother regiments, as emergency reinforcement for the 1st Marine Division. The first US Army unit to conduct an offensive operation against the enemy in either the Pacific or European Theater of Operations. Between 24 and 27 October, elements of the regiment withstood repeated assaults from Japanese battalions and inflicted some two thousand enemy casualties; the 164th also supported and participated in Marine attacks. The First Marine Division's commander, Major General A. A. Vandegrift, was so impressed by the soldiers' stand that he issued a unit commendation to the regiment for having demonstrated "an overwhelming superiority over the enemy." In addition, General Vandegrift took the unusual step of awarding Lieutenant Colonel Robert Hall, commander of the 3rd Battalion, 164th, with the Navy Cross for his role in these battles. The 164th was then occasionally referred to as the '164th Marines' due to their special relationship with the Marines on Guadalcanal.

The second echelon of the Americal Division arrived on Guadalcanal on 12 November. Later in the same month, the 164th took part in the offensive across the Matanikau River. On 9 December 1942, the Americal Division assumed control of all combat operations on Guadalcanal and relieved the 1st Marine Division. On 1 January 1943, General Patch relinquished command of the Americal Division to Brigadier General Edmund B. Sebree. General Patch assumed command of the XIV Corps, which assumed command of all allied forces on the Guadalcanal. In January 1943, the 132nd Infantry Regiment of the division took Hill 27 and 31 of the Mount Austen complex. The division later participated in offensives to sweep Guadalcanal of remaining Japanese resistance. After the last Japanese defenders were killed, captured, or evacuated from the island, the division was relieved on 9 February 1943. Despite its ad hoc formation, the Americal Division fought well at Guadalcanal. The 164th Regiment took part in repulsing a major Japanese offensive in October 1942, while the 132nd Regiment, along with the 25th Infantry Division assaulted the highly fortified Japanese Gifu defensive complex at Mount Austen in January 1943. Historians describe the Americal Division as the most effective of all the US Army divisions in that campaign. Following the withdrawal of the 1st Marine Division, the division continued operations on Guadalcanal as part of the U.S. XIV Corps with the 25th Infantry Division (who later earned their 'Tropic Lightning' nickname here) and the 2nd Marine Division, which had arrived earlier as reinforcements to the 1st Marine Division, until the Imperial Japanese Navy evacuated the last remaining Japanese troops in Operation Ke.

==== Division organization ====
On 1 March 1943, the first echelon of the Americal Division left Guadalcanal, bound for Viti Levu Island in Fiji, where the division engaged in extensive training. On May 29, Major General John R. Hodge assumed command of the Americal. In September 1943, the Americal division was reorganized under the new TO&E published on 15 July 1943. The Americal Division consisted afterwards of the following units.

Americal Division organization (click to enlarge)

- Americal Division
  - Americal Division Headquarters
  - 21st Cavalry Reconnaissance Troop (Mechanized) (M3 scout cars and then M8 Greyhound armored cars)
  - 132nd Infantry Regiment (Illinois Army National Guard)
    - Headquarters and Headquarters Company
    - 3× Infantry battalions
      - each battalion consists of: 1× Headquarters and Headquarters Company, 3× Rifle companies, 1× Heavy Weapons Company
    - Cannon Company (T12 Gun Motor Carriages and T19 Howitzer Motor Carriages, later replaced by either M3 105mm towed howitzers or M7 Priest self propelled howitzers)
    - Anti-Tank Company (M3 37mm anti-tank guns, which were replaced by 1944 with M1 57mm anti-tank guns)
    - Service Company
  - 164th Infantry Regiment (North Dakota Army National Guard)
    - same organization as 132nd Infantry Regiment
  - 182nd Infantry Regiment (Massachusetts Army National Guard)
    - same organization as 132nd Infantry Regiment
  - Americal Division Artillery
    - Headquarters and Headquarters Battery (activated on 26 October 1942)
    - 221st Field Artillery Battalion
      - Headquarters and Headquarters Battery
      - 3× Batteries (M1 155mm towed howitzers)
      - Service Battery
    - 245th Field Artillery Battalion
      - Headquarters and Headquarters Battery
      - 3× Batteries (M2 105mm towed howitzers)
      - Service Battery
    - 246th Field Artillery Battalion
      - same organization as 245th Field Artillery Battalion
    - 247th Field Artillery Battalion
      - same organization as 245th Field Artillery Battalion
  - Headquarters Special Troops
    - Headquarters Company, Americal Division
    - 26th Signal Company
    - 125th Quartermaster Company
    - 721st Ordnance Light Maintenance Company
    - Military Police Platoon
    - Americal Division Band (attached)
  - 57th Engineer Combat Battalion
    - Headquarters and Headquarters and Service Company
    - 3× Engineer combat companies
  - 121st Medical Battalion
    - Headquarters and Headquarters Detachment
    - 3× Collecting companies
    - Clearing Company

==== Bougainville ====
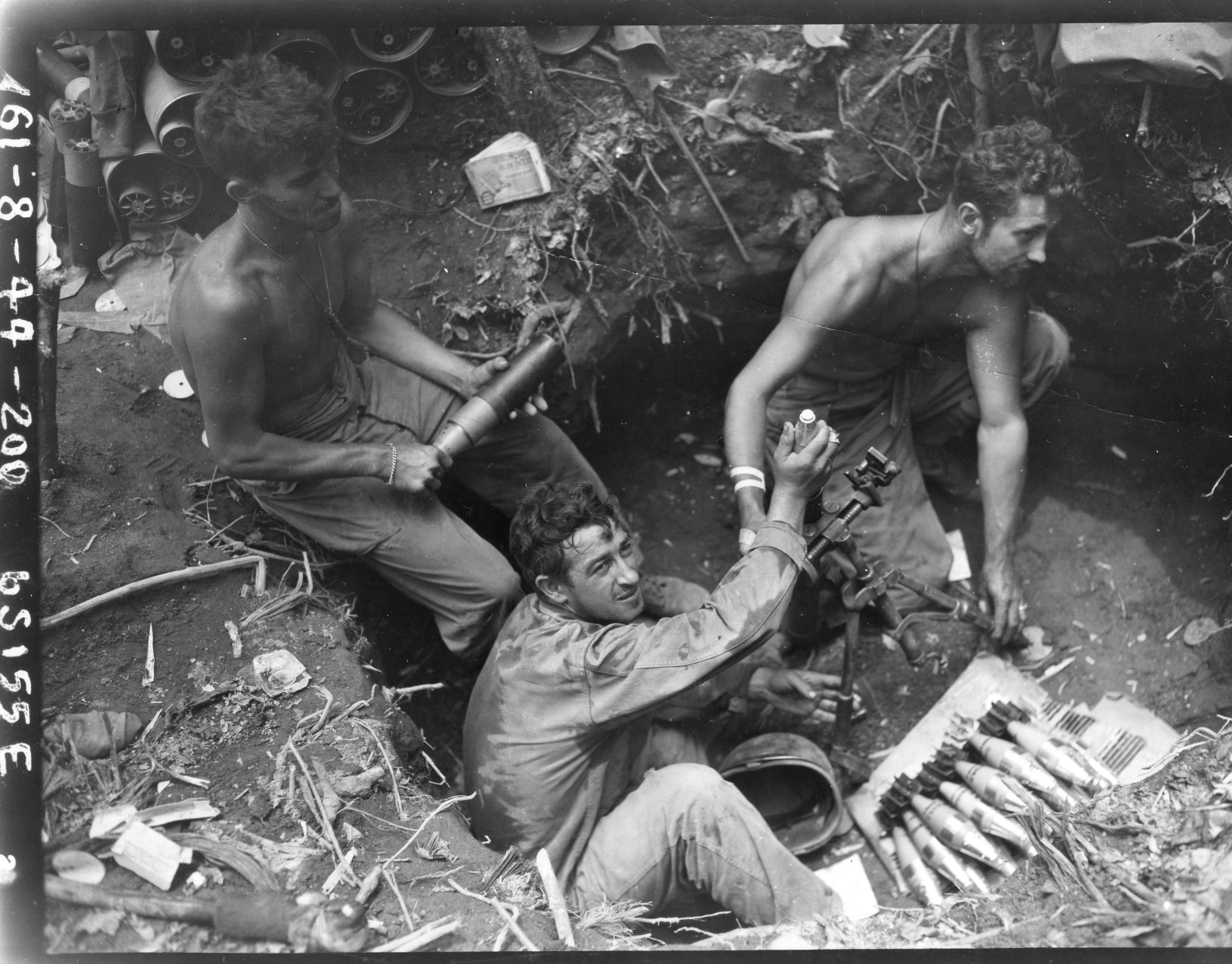
Mortar crew of Company B, 132nd Infantry, Americal Division at Bougainville, 10 March 1944.

During the period 25 December 1943 to 12 January 1944 the Americal Division landed on Bougainville, relieving the 3rd Marine Division. They were given the task (alongside the 37th Infantry Division and a Marine defense battalion) of holding and extending the right half of a previously established perimeter.

Warned by intelligence, they met a massive and sustained Japanese counter-attack, which began on 7 March 1944. Despite ample warning and thorough defensive preparations, the battle soon degenerated into a bitter, close-quarters infantry affair, with artillery restricted by the need to avoid friendly troops and tanks unable to reach the scene. The 37th and Americal Divisions stood firm, and by 25 March, the Japanese were forced to retreat. It was the last Japanese ground offensive in the South Pacific.

The division went on the offensive in March 1944, driving the Japanese east of Mananga River, 7–9 April 1944, and seizing numerous strategic hill bases during the remainder of the month. Training and long-range patrol activity continued until 30 November 1944 when the division was relieved.

==== Philippines ====
On 8 January 1945, the division began movement to Leyte and Samar, to take part in cleaning out remaining Japanese forces on those islands, and to invade Biri, Capul, Ticao, and Burias. On Leyte, the division was relieved on 13 March 1945 and then landed on Cebu on 26 March, and seized the city and airfield by 28 March. Divisional combat teams made landings on Bohol, Negros, and Mindanao, where they cleared out pockets of resisting Japanese until 17 June when ordered to return to Cebu, arriving on 25 June. The Americal Division added by the newly local Filipino troops of the Philippine Commonwealth Army and Philippine Constabulary and the recognized guerrillas for the liberated in Visayas and Mindanao against the Japanese.

Training continued on Cebu for the proposed invasion of Japan, but the Japanese surrendered on 14 August 1945. On 10 September 1945, the Americal Division landed in Japan and took part in the occupation of the Yokohama–Kawasaki–Yokosuka area.

==== Casualties ====
- Total battle casualties: 4,050
- Killed in action: 981
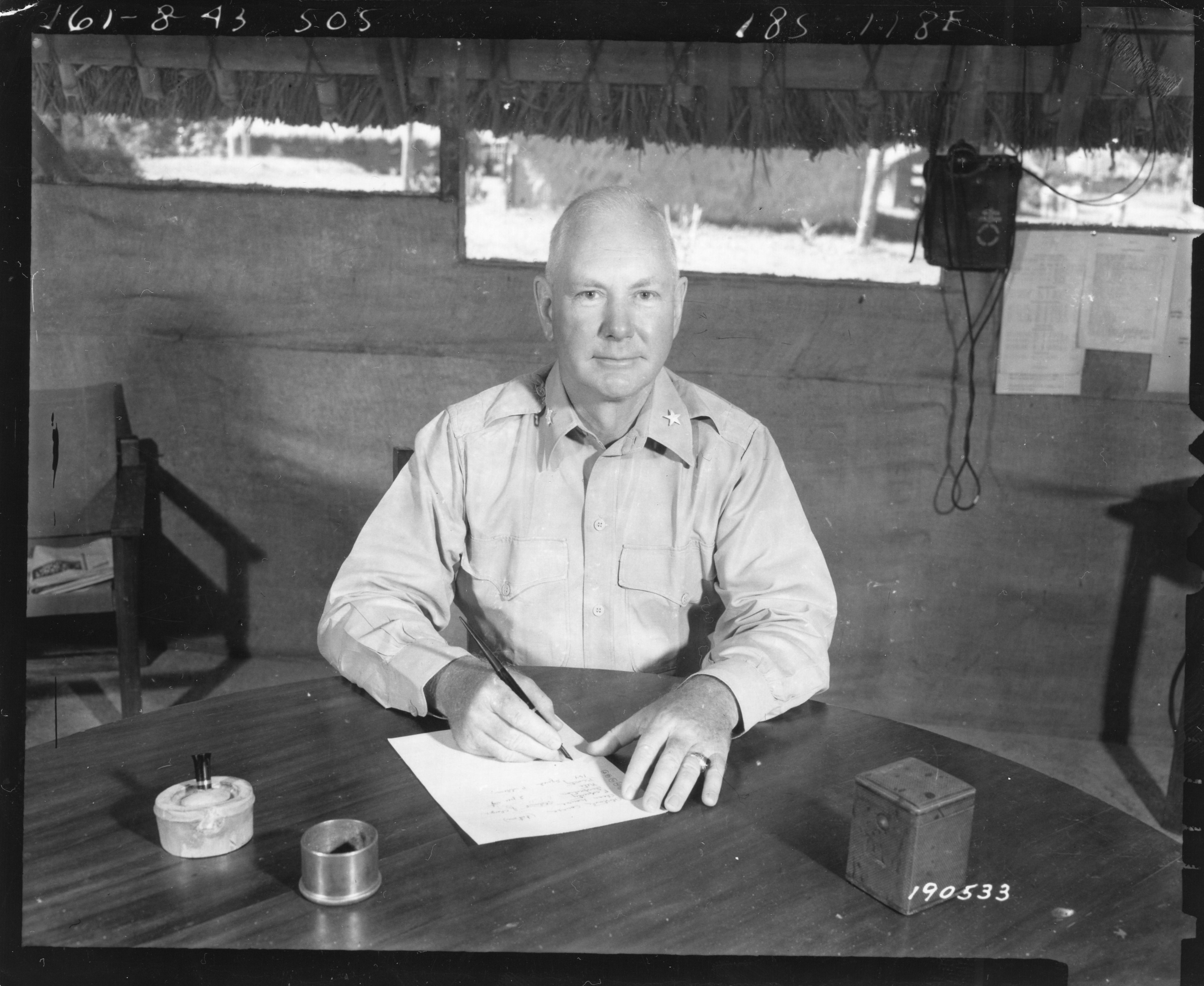
  Brigadier General William A. McCulloch, Assistant Division Commander, Americal Division in the South Pacific. 23 November 1943.
- Wounded in action: 3,052
- Missing in action: 16
- Prisoner of war: 1

=== Postwar ===
The division returned to the United States on 21 November 1945, and was inactivated on 12 December 1945 at Fort Lewis, Washington State. It was reactivated on 1 December 1954 as the 23rd Infantry Division, retaining the name "Americal" as part of its official designation. On 2 December 1954 the 65th Infantry Regiment was assigned to the division. The 23rd Division encompassed geographically-separated units in the Caribbean region. On 10 April 1956, the 65th Infantry Regiment was inactivated at Camp Losey, Puerto Rico, and relieved from assignment to the 23d, which itself was inactivated. The division served in the Panama Canal Zone until 10 April 1956, when it was again inactivated.

=== Vietnam War ===
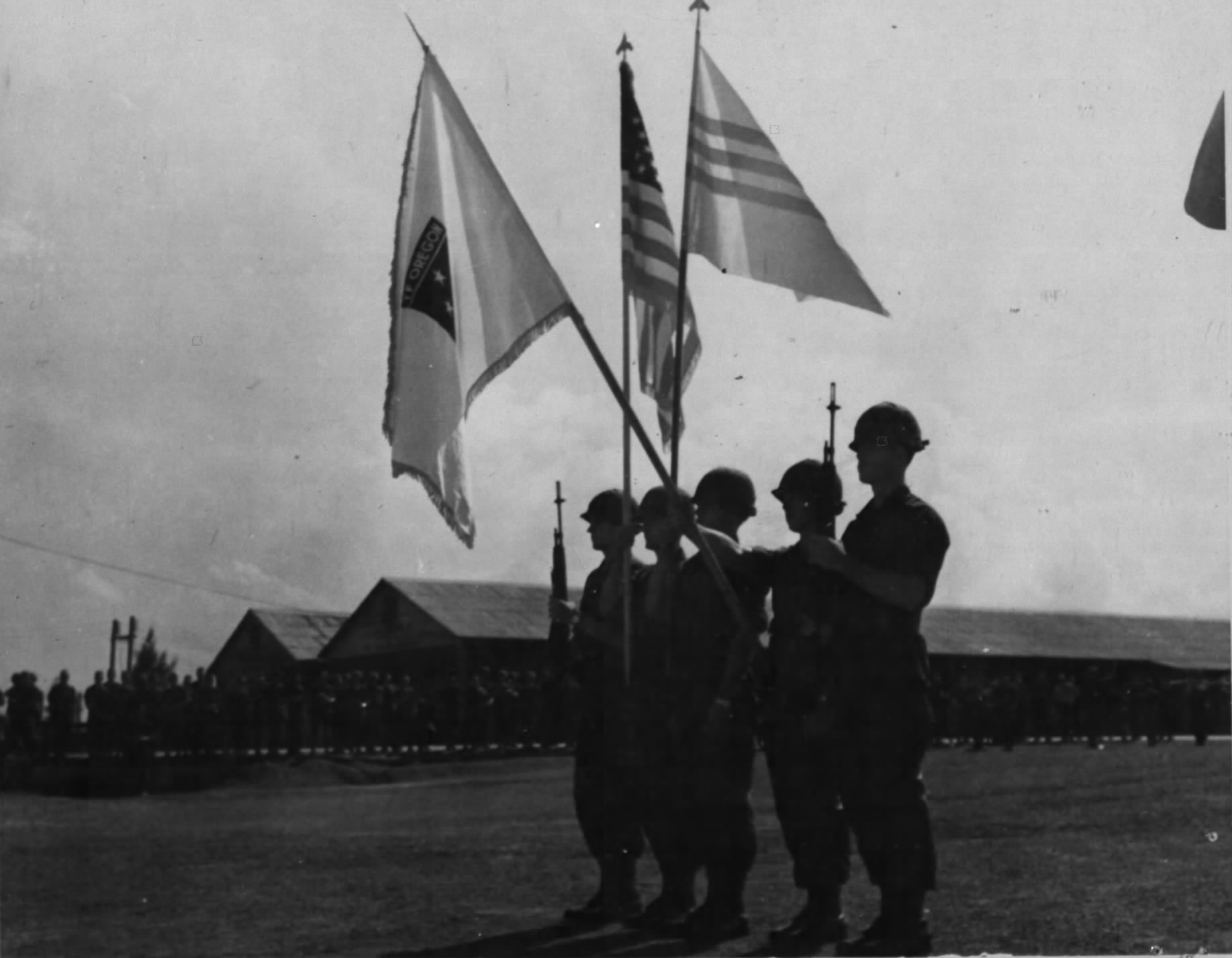
Americal Division colors ceremony, Chu Lai, 27 October 1967

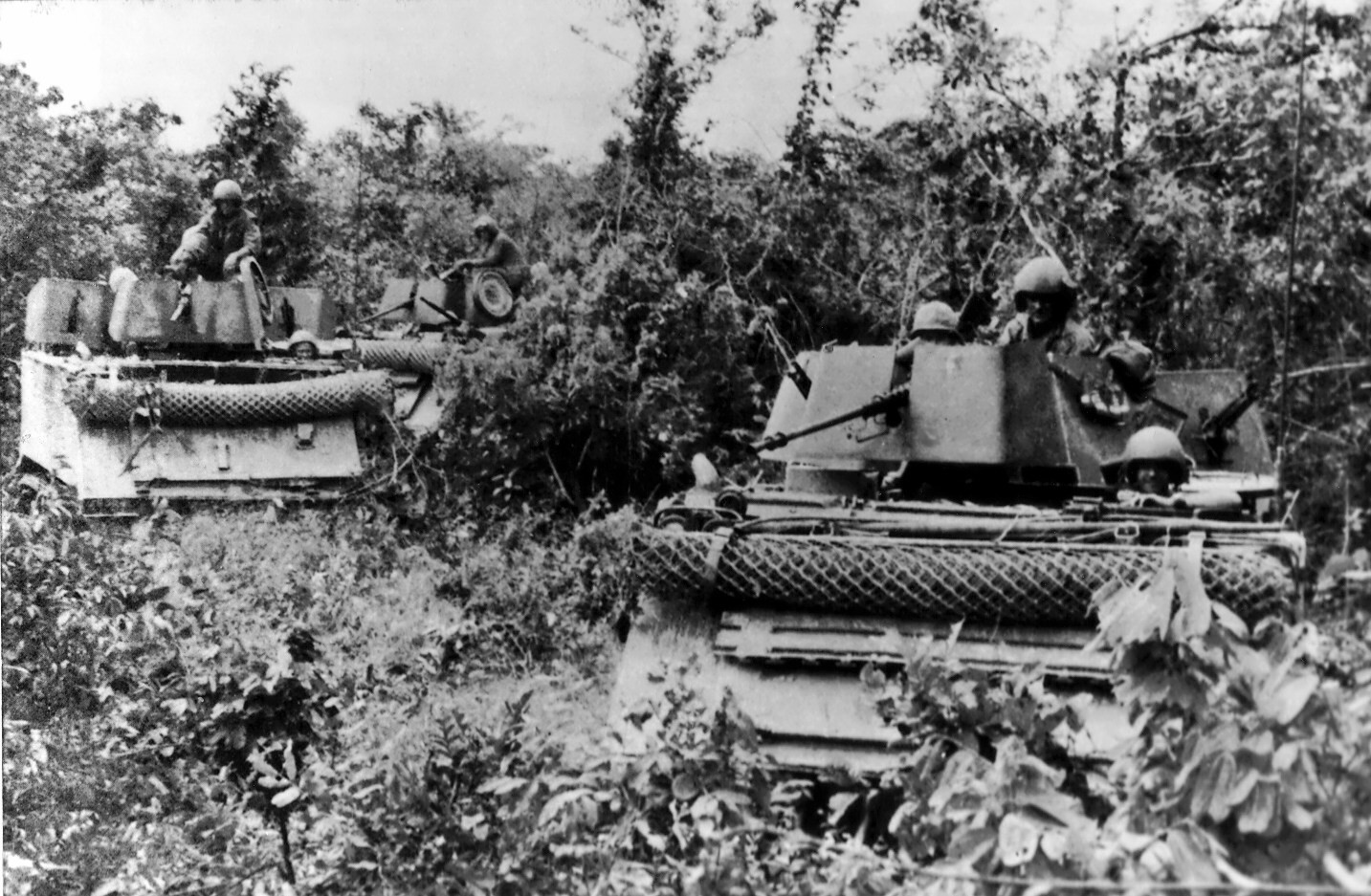
Americal Division in Tam Kỳ – Armored cavalry assault vehicles (M113) with anti-RPG screens - March 1968

The division was reactivated 25 September 1967 at Chu Lai in Vietnam from a combination of units already in Vietnam and newly arrived units. Its precursor, a division-sized task force known as Task Force Oregon was created in Quảng Ngãi and Quảng Tín provinces from the 3rd Brigade of the 25th Infantry Division, the 1st Brigade of the 101st Airborne Division, and the 196th Light Infantry Brigade (all brigades that deployed separately to Vietnam in 1966). Task Force Oregon operated in close cooperation with the 1st Marine Division in the I Corps Military Region. As more US Army units arrived in Vietnam the two divisional brigades were released back to their parent organizations and two arriving separate brigades were assigned to Task Force Oregon, which was in turn re-designated the 23rd Infantry Division (Americal).

The division was composed of the 11th, 196th, and 198th Light Infantry Brigades and divisional support units. Both the 11th and 198th brigades were newly formed units. On 8 December 1967 Company C, 123d Aviation Battalion, an element of the division, was constituted, and activated in Vietnam.

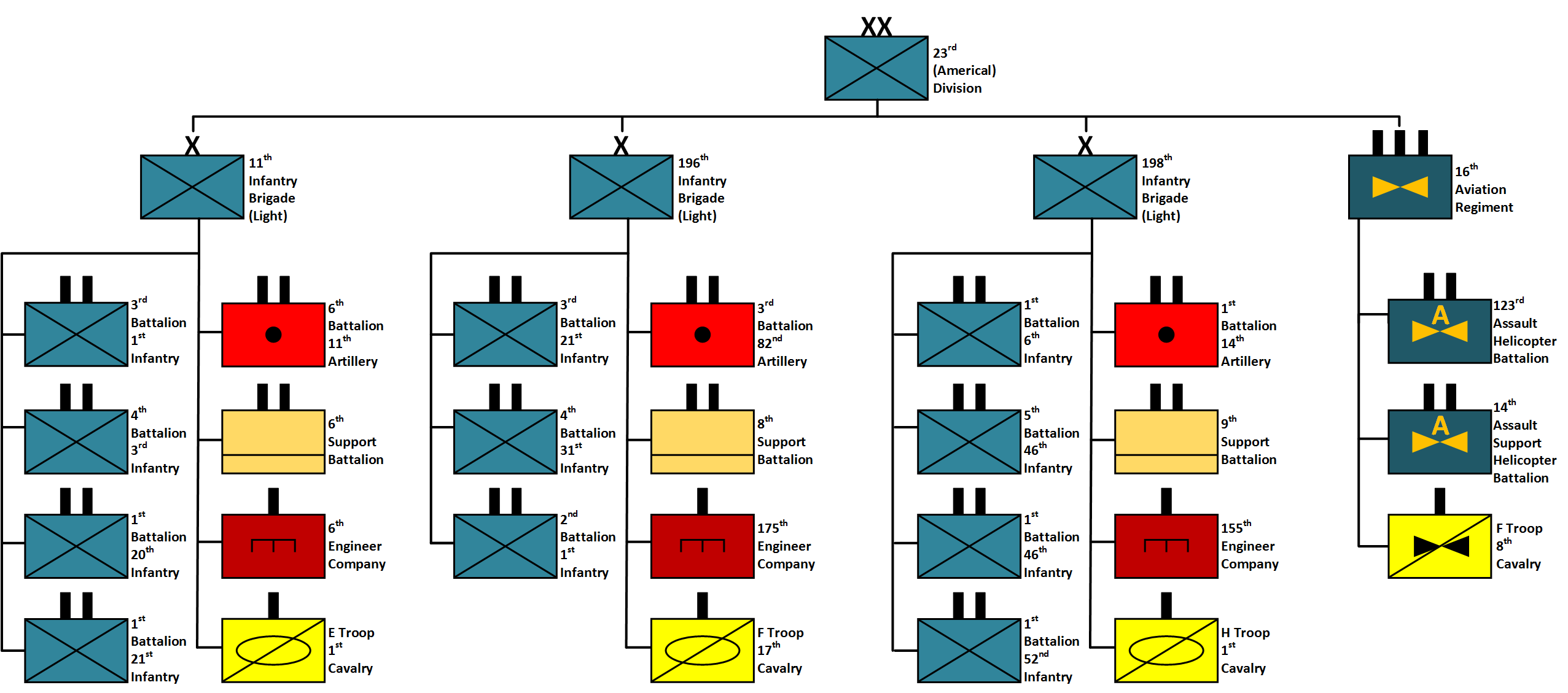
Organization of the 23rd Infantry Division in Vietnam in 1967

The division suffered an important defeat at the Battle of Kham Duc but gave a solid performance during the Tet Offensive, the Battle of Lo Giang and the Battle of Landing Zone Center/Hill 352. Platoon Sergeant Finnis McCleery was awarded the Medal of Honor for his valiant efforts on Hill 352. Sgt. Alan Allen was awarded the Silver Star for this same battle. Both men were members of A Co. 1/6 198th. 20 men from A Company were lost in the Battle of Lo Giang on 8 February 1968. A Co. of the 198th was awarded the Presidential Unit Citation for its heroic efforts in the Battle of Lo Giang, 8 February 1968.

The division became notorious after its 1st Platoon, Company C, 1st Battalion, 20th Infantry (11th Infantry Brigade) led by Lieutenant William Calley slaughtered hundreds of South Vietnamese civilians in the My Lai Massacre in March 1968. A helicopter crew from the division's 123rd Aviation Battalion, led by Hugh Thompson, Jr., attempted to intervene in the massacre and were later awarded the Soldier's Medal. Seymour Hersh broke the story of the massacre in November 1969, and a year later 14 officers – including Samuel W. Koster, the division's commanding officer – were charged with covering the massacre up. Most of the charges were later dropped, but Koster was subsequently demoted and stripped of his Distinguished Service Medal. Calley was charged, convicted and sentenced to life imprisonment and hard labor on 31 March 1971 for the murder of 22 Vietnamese civilians. President Richard Nixon soon intervened and on 1 April 1971 ordered Calley transferred from Fort Leavenworth to house arrest at Fort Benning, pending his appeal. Calley, the only person convicted, eventually served only three and half years of house arrest and was released in September 1974.

Brigadier General John W. Donaldson was later tried for shooting civilians from helicopters on 13 separate incidents. Donaldson was the highest-ranking officer to undergo court-martial during the war, but charges were eventually dropped due to lack of evidence. These allegations were raised by helicopter pilots under his command, and senior military investigators alleged that senior commanders of the division including Donaldson had routinely "...bet in the morning how many people they could kill – old people, civilians, it didn't matter", but the investigation was closed due to a lack of evidence.

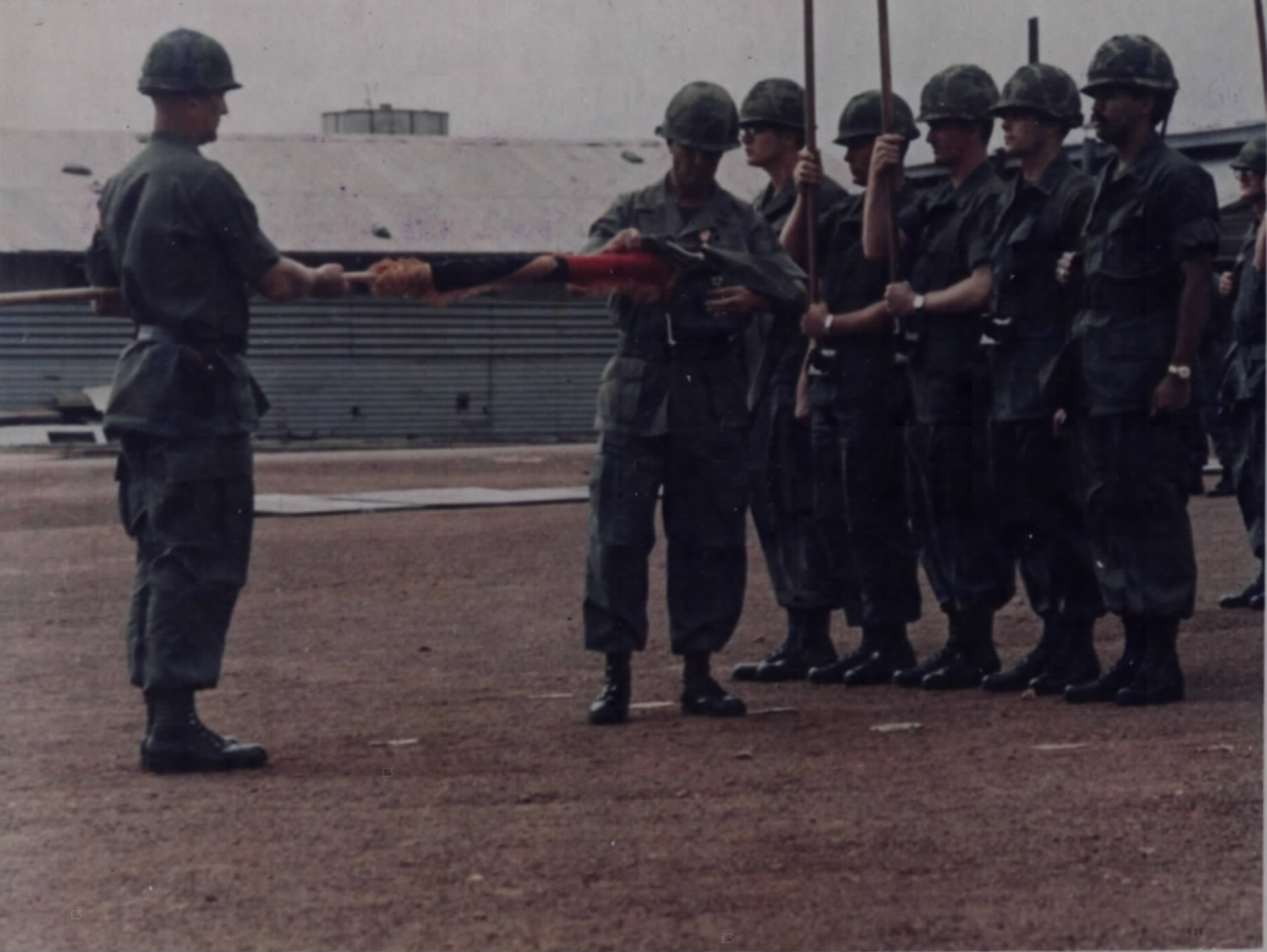
MG Frederick J. Kroesen, Jr., holds the unit colors as they are cased, Chu Lai, 11 November 1971

On 28 March 1971, Vietcong sappers attacked Firebase Mary Ann in Quang Tin Province near the Demilitarized Zone, which was being transferred by the 1st Battalion, 46th Infantry Regiment to the ARVN, resulting in 33 US/ARVN killed. The 198th and 11th Brigades were withdrawn from Vietnam in November 1971, and the division was inactivated. The 196th Brigade was reconstituted as a separate brigade and remained in Vietnam until 29 June 1972, the last major combat unit to be withdrawn. Its 3rd Battalion, 21st infantry (Gimlets) was the last U.S. maneuver battalion to leave Vietnam, on 23 August 1972.

== Division insignia ==
The shoulder sleeve insignia was originally approved for the Americal Division on 20 December 1943. It was redesignated for the 23d Infantry Division on 4 November 1954. On 14 December 1967 the distinctive unit insignia was approved. The shoulder sleeve insignia's four white stars on a blue field are symbolic of the Southern Cross under which the organization has served. The blue color stands for the infantry branch.

On the distinctive unit insignia, the blue saltire (cross of St. Andrew) alludes to New Caledonia in the Southwest Pacific where the division was created and first activated on 27 May 1942. Each of the four white stars stands for the Southern Cross constellation on its division insignia, as well as the four World War II campaigns (Guadalcanal, Northern Solomons, Leyte and Southern Philippines) in which the division participated. The anchor refers to the Presidential Unit Citation (Navy) awarded the division for Guadalcanal. The red arrowhead and Philippine sun stand for the assault landing, Southern Philippines, and the award of the Philippine Presidential Unit Citation (7 October 1944 to 4 July 1945). The unsheathed sword with point to top refers to Vietnam where the division was active. In view of the division's origin and outstanding service in World War II and inasmuch as it was one of the few U.S. Army divisions to bear a name instead of a number, the division's former name "Americal" has been taken as a motto, the association with that name being both inspirational and of historical military significance.

== Commanders ==
MG Alexander Patch, Jr. (May–December 1942)
BG Edmund Sebree (January–May 1943)
MG John R. Hodge (May 1943 – April 1944)
MG Robert B. McClure (April–October 1944)
MG William H. Arnold (November 1944 to WW II inactivation)
MG Samuel W. Koster (October 1967 – June 1968)
MG Charles M. Gettys (June 1968 – June 1969)
MG Lloyd B. Ramsey (June 1969 – March 1970)
MG Albert E. Milloy (March–November 1970)
MG James L. Baldwin (November 1970 – July 1971)
MG Frederick J. Kroesen (July–November 1971 (Vietnam inactivation))

== Notable former members ==
- Nicky Daniel Bacon, Medal of Honor recipient 26 August 1968 action
- Rocky Bleier, wounded 20 August 1969 recovered to play in the NFL
- William Calley, infamous participant in My Lai Massacre
- Joseph Cresenz, Medal of Honor recipient 20 November 1968 action
- Kern Wayne Dunagan, Medal of Honor recipient 13 May 1969 action
- Jesse R. Drowley, Medal of Honor recipient 30 January 1944 action
- Bill Hardiman
- Woodrow W. (Woody) Keeble, Medal of Honor recipient 20 Oct 1951 actions
- Charles Kettles, 1967–1970, Medal of Honor recipient 15 May 1967 action
- Tracy Kidder, 1968–69
- GEN Frederick J. Kroesen, Vice Chief of Staff of the United States Army and U.S. Army Europe Commander
- Frederick Lippitt
- Finnis Dawson McCleery, Medal of Honor recipient 14 May 1968 action
- Thomas Joseph McMahon, Medal of Honor recipient 19 March 1969 action
- Ernest Medina, infamous participant in My Lai Massacre
- Marc W. Miller
- Robert Charles Murray, Medal of Honor recipient 14 May 1969 action
- Tim O'Brien, 1969–70
- Colin Powell, 1968–70, Chairman of the Joint Chiefs of Staff
- Robert Joseph Pruden, Medal of Honor recipient 29 November 1969 action
- Tom Ridge, 1969–70
- H. Norman Schwarzkopf, 1969–70
- James McCloughan, Medal of Honor recipient 13–15 May 1969 action
- Daniel John Shea, Medal of Honor recipient 14 May 1969 action
- Donald Paul Sloat, Medal of Honor recipient 17 January 1970 action
- Lester Raymond Stone, Jr., Medal of Honor recipient 3 March 1969 action
- James Allen Taylor, Medal of Honor recipient 9 November 1967 action
- Hugh Thompson Jr., awarded Soldiers Medal (30 years later) for his role in stopping the My Lai massacre.
- David Francis Winder, Medal of Honor recipient 13 May 1970 action
- Patrick Henry Brady, attached to Americal-Medal of Honor recipient 6 January 1968 action
- Joseph G. Clemons, of Pork Chop Hill fame
- Larry Nelson, PGA golf Champion
