= Conex box =

Type of cargo container

CONEX (Container, express) Box
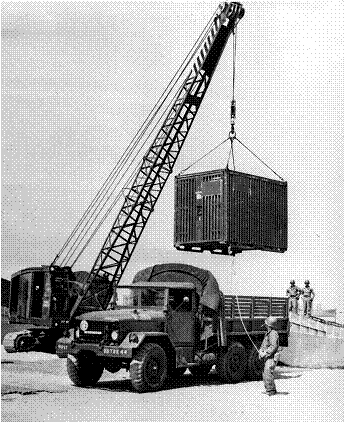
- A conex box hoisted onto a U.S. Army truck
- Type: Shipping container
- Inventor: Transportation Corps
- Inception: Late 1952
- Manufacturer: U.S. Army

A mix of modern standard containers and old Conex boxes used for training purposes, Fort Carson, 2013

The CONEX box, a portmanteau of "Container, express", is a type of cargo container that was developed during the Korean War and was used to transport and store supplies during the Korean and Vietnam wars. It was reinvented by Malcom McLean to form the standard intermodal shipping container, often called an ISO box, after ISO 668/ISO 6346, that is used widely by container shipping companies today.

== History ==
The use of standardized steel and aluminum shipping containers began during the late 1940s and early 1950s, when commercial shipping operators and the U.S. military started developing such units. During World War II, the U.S. Army began experiments with containers to ship supplies to the front lines. Cargo was being delayed at ports due to the time required by break bulk loading and offloading of ships. In addition, the supplies suffered from pilferage and in-transit damage.

In 1948, the U.S. Army Transportation Corps developed the "Transporter", a rigid, corrugated steel container, able to carry 9,000 pounds (4,082 kg). It was 8 ft 6 in (2.59 m) long, 6 ft 3 in (1.91 m) wide, and 6 ft 10 in (2.08 m) high, with double doors on one end, was mounted on skids, and had lifting rings on the top four corners.

After proving successful in Korea, the Transporter was developed into the Container Express (CONEX) box system in late 1952. Based on the Transporter, the size and capacity of the Conex were about the same, (Note: 8' 6" length, 6' 3" width and 6' 10 1/2" height, and 9000 lbs capacity.) but the system was made modular, by the addition of a smaller, half-size unit of 6 ft 3 in (1.91 m) long, 4 ft 3 in (1.30 m) wide and 6 ft 10 1/2 in (2.10 m) high. (Note: Some sources also mention a 12-foot version.) CONEXes could be stacked three high, and protected their contents from the elements.

By 1965, the U.S. military had some 100,000 CONEX boxes. By 1967, over 100,000 more had been procured to support the escalation of the Vietnam War, making this the world's first intercontinental application of intermodal containers. More than three quarters were shipped only once, because they remained in theater. The CONEX boxes were as useful to the soldiers as their contents, in particular as storage facilities where there were no other options.

The term "CONEX" remains in common use in the U.S. military to refer to the similar but larger ISO-standard shipping containers.

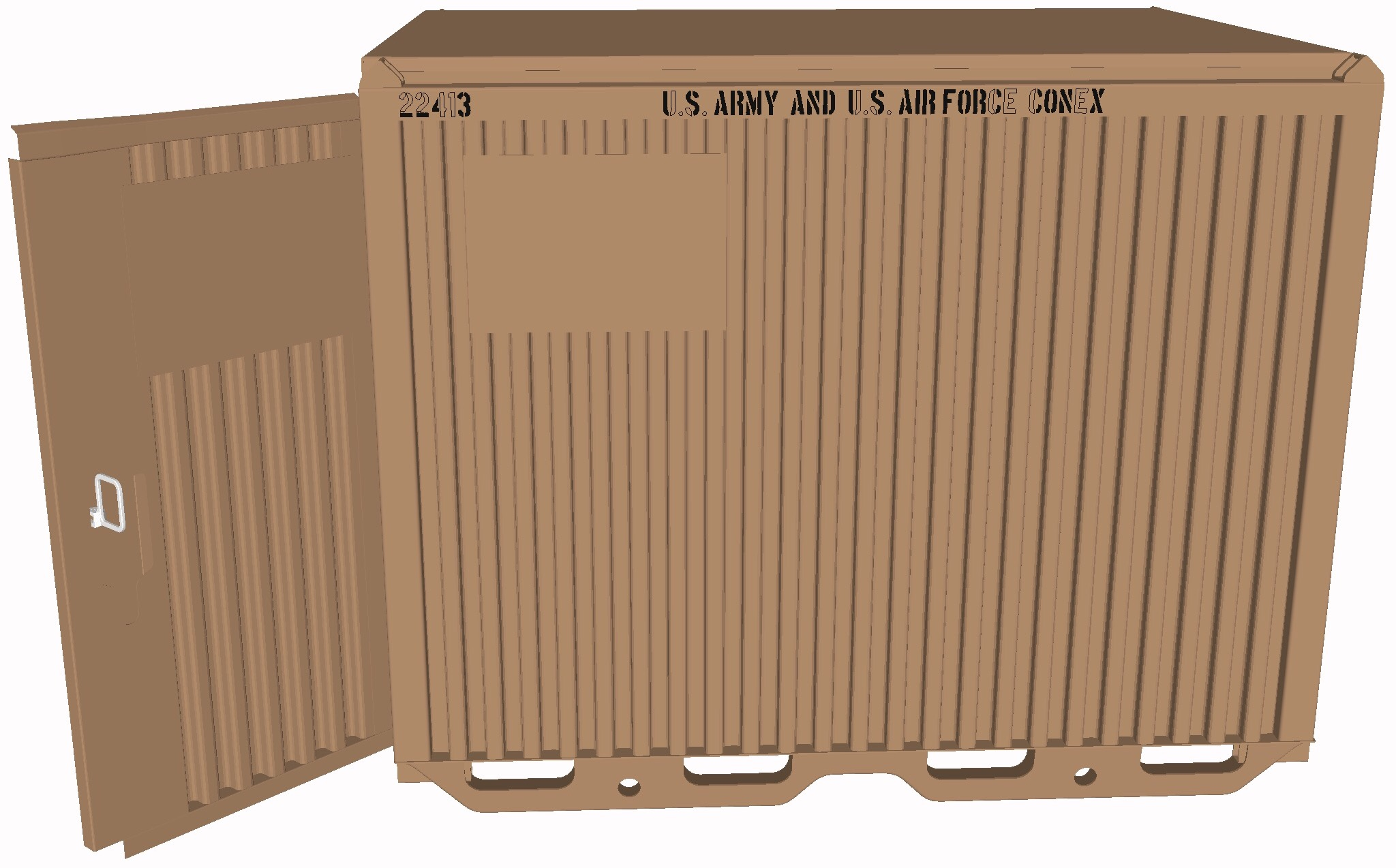

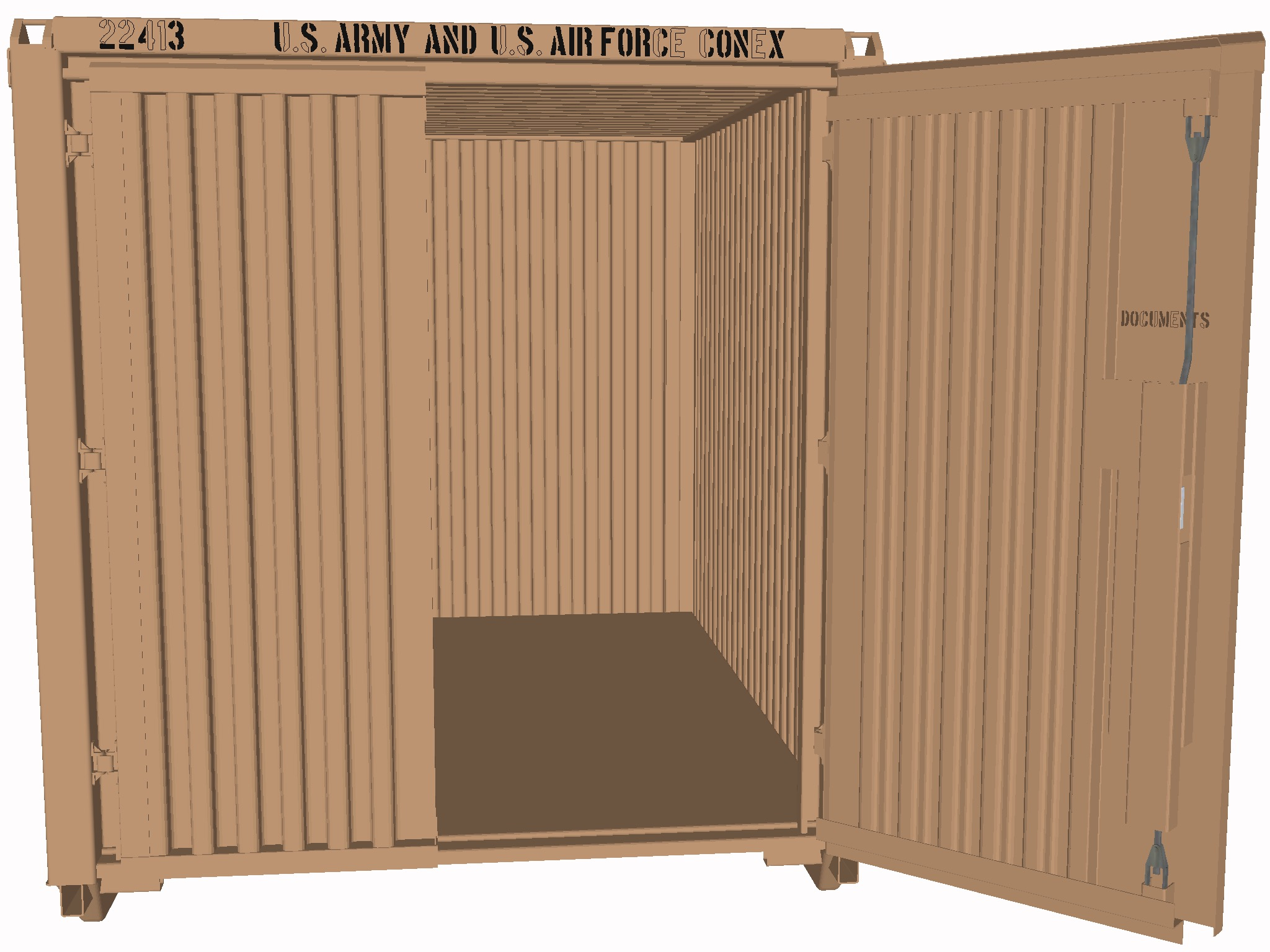

== See also ==
- Intermodal container
- Containerization
