= Finnis D. McCleery =

United States Army Medal of Honor recipient (1927–2002)

Finnis Dawson McCleery
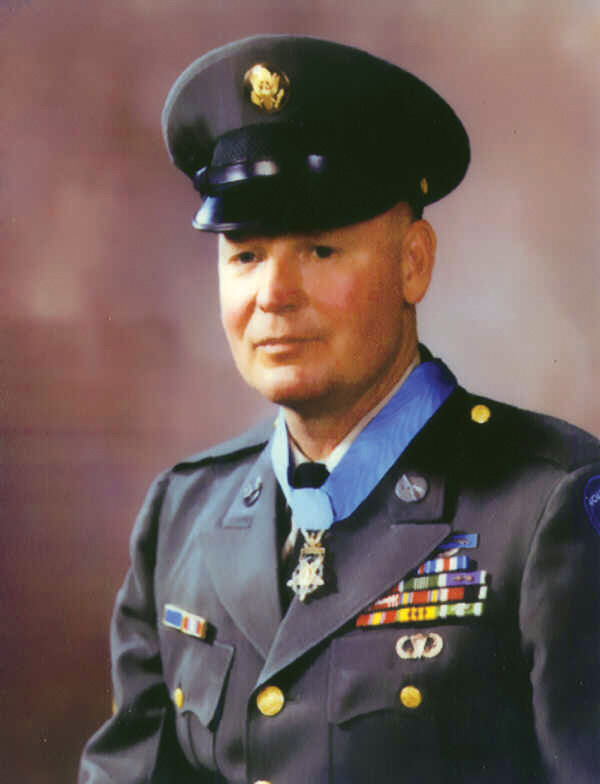
- Sergeant Finnis McCleery
- Born: December 25, 1927; Stephenville, Texas, US
- Died: July 11, 2002 (aged 74)
- Burial place: Belvedere Memorial Cemetery, San Angelo, Texas, US
- Military career
- Allegiance: United States
- Branch: United States Army
- Rank: Platoon Sergeant
- Units: 1st Platoon, Company A, 1st Battalion, 6th Infantry Regiment, 198th Infantry Brigade
- Conflicts: Korean War; Vietnam War
- Awards: Medal of Honor; Silver Star; Bronze Star with valor device Purple Heart with two oak leaf clusters

Finnis Dawson McCleery (December 25, 1927 – July 11, 2002) was a United States Army soldier and a recipient of the United States military's highest decoration—the Medal of Honor—for his actions in the Vietnam War.

== Biography ==
McCleery joined the Army from San Angelo, Texas, and by May 14, 1968, was serving as a platoon sergeant in 1st Platoon, Company A, 1st Battalion, 6th Infantry Regiment. During an assault on that day during the Battle of Landing Zone Center, in Quang Tin Province, Republic of Vietnam, McCleery single-handedly attacked and destroyed several enemy bunkers despite being wounded twice.

McCleery left the Army while still a platoon sergeant. He died at age 74 and was buried in Belvedere Memorial Cemetery, San Angelo, Texas.

McCleery was married to Lena Mae McCleery and had seven children, Jack Hollis, Roger McCleery, Curtis McCleery, Lisa Power, Donna St.Clair, Deena Moore, and Darla Piper. He was a grandfather and great grandfather at the time of his death.

== Medal of Honor citation ==
Platoon Sergeant McCleery's official Medal of Honor citation reads:

For conspicuous gallantry and intrepidity in action at the risk of his life above and beyond the call of duty. P/Sgt. McCleery, U.S. Army, distinguished himself while serving as platoon leader of the 1st platoon of Company A. A combined force was assigned the mission of assaulting a reinforced company of North Vietnamese Army regulars, well entrenched on Hill 352, 17 miles west of Tam Ky. As P/Sgt. McCleery led his men up the hill and across an open area to close with the enemy, his platoon and other friendly elements were pinned down by tremendously heavy fire coming from the fortified enemy positions. Realizing the severe damage that the enemy could inflict on the combined force in the event that their attack was completely halted, P/Sgt. McCleery rose from his sheltered position and began a 1-man assault on the bunker complex. With extraordinary courage, he moved across 60 meters of open ground as bullets struck all around him and rockets and grenades literally exploded at his feet. As he came within 30 meters of the key enemy bunker, P/Sgt. McCleery began firing furiously from the hip and throwing hand grenades. At this point in his assault, he was painfully wounded by shrapnel, but, with complete disregard for his wound, he continued his advance on the key bunker and killed all of its occupants. Having successfully and single-handedly breached the enemy perimeter, he climbed to the top of the bunker he had just captured and, in full view of the enemy, shouted encouragement to his men to follow his assault. As the friendly forces moved forward, P/Sgt. McCleery began a lateral assault on the enemy bunker line. He continued to expose himself to the intense enemy fire as he moved from bunker to bunker, destroying each in turn. He was wounded a second time by shrapnel as he destroyed and routed the enemy from the hill. P/Sgt. McCleery is personally credited with eliminating several key enemy positions and inspiring the assault that resulted in gaining control of Hill 352. His extraordinary heroism at the risk of his life, above and beyond the call of duty, was in keeping with the highest standards of the military service, and reflects great credit on him, the Americal Division, and the U.S. Army.

== See also ==
- List of Medal of Honor recipients
- List of Medal of Honor recipients for the Vietnam War
