= Task Force Barker =

United States Army task force

Task Force Barker was a United States Army task force under the command of Lieutenant Colonel Frank A. Barker during the Vietnam War. While a part of Task Force Barker, U.S. Army soldiers from Company C of the 1st Battalion, 20th Infantry Regiment, 11th Brigade of the 23rd (Americal) Infantry Division committed the My Lai Massacre in 1968.

On 16 March 1968, Task Force Barker, an American combat task force of the 23rd Infantry Division, assaulted the Son My village complex in the Quang Ngai province of South Vietnam. Members of the task force proceeded to destroy most of the homes in the village, kill domestic animals, rape female civilians, and in-discriminately murder hundreds of civilian children, women, and elderly people.

== Composition and structure ==
This force of about 500 men was composed of three companies of the 11th Light Infantry Brigade, of the American Division and had been formed in January 1968. The Americal Division had the honorable reputation of being "the first unit in the US Army to successfully conduct offensive operations against the enemy in all of the global events of World War II."

In detail these were:

- The A, B, and C companies of 1st Battalion, 20th Infantry (1/20) Americal Division
- The D Company, a composite artillery unit of the 11th Light Infantry Brigade, the 6 / 11th Artillery Battalion
- For this purpose 9 transport helicopters and gunships, "DOLPHINS & SHARKS", of the 174th Assault Helicopter Company together with the B company of the 23rd Aviation Battalion from Hunter Army Airfield were used for logistical support

C Company had been assigned to the task force in late February 1968.

== Command management ==
- Major General Sam Koster - Americal Division
- Brigadier General George H. Young - Assistant Division Commander
- Col. Oran K. Henderson - 11th Infantry Brigade
- Lieutenant Colonel Frank A. Barker - Task Force Commander
- Captain Ernest Medina - C Company Commander
- Second Lieutenant William Calley - Commander of the 1st Platoon

== Mission ==
The TF Barker's mission was to be a planned, temporary strike against the Viet Cong on the coast of the South China Sea, which was believed to be a stronghold of the political and military wing of the Viet Cong. The order for this was "Search and destroy", a US military tactic that was increasingly used in the course of the Vietnam War. The TF operated from LF Dottie, about 10 km north of Quang Nhai on Vietnamese National Highway 1.

Because the operational plan was not put on paper, it is no longer possible to clarify exactly which job TF Barker had in detail. It is certain, however, that she would pursue the remnants of the 48th Viet Cong Local Force Battalion in a three-day operation, Operation Muscatine. The operation was named by Major General Sam Koster, who chose this name based on a neighboring town in his home village in Iowa. This Vietnamese battalion, which had been severely decimated during the fighting for the town of Quảng Ngãi at the time of the Tet Offensive, was suspected to be in the extensive settlement area of Son My. This operation lasted from 16–18 March 1968.

In addition, while combing through the villages, the political functionaries should be tracked down and, if necessary, liquidated. The “black lists” drawn up by the CIA and other military secret services speak for this. It remains questionable whether the task force was even aware of or in possession of these blacklists.

The officers of TF Barker were able to proceed at their own discretion when carrying out their mandate. This offered a welcome opportunity for the management team to put themselves in the limelight and possibly combine successes that could promote a career. As a result, the troop leaders finally gave their soldiers a license to kill indiscriminately. A message on the day before the operation read: “All residents of Son My Village are sympathizers or supporters of the Viet Cong and thus second class civilians."

On the morning of 16 March 1968, around 8:00 AM local time, several companies of the TF Barker were deployed in the Son My district to comb this terrain in the province of Quảng Ngãi, because a battalion of the Viet Cong was suspected there. When the helicopters returned to pick up the troops at around eleven, My Lai was erased. Between 490 and 520 dead women, children, middle-aged men, old people and babies, as well as the villagers' livestock, were scattered in or around the village on dirt roads, rice fields or in moats.
