= Hugh Thompson Jr. =

United States Army officer (1943–2006)

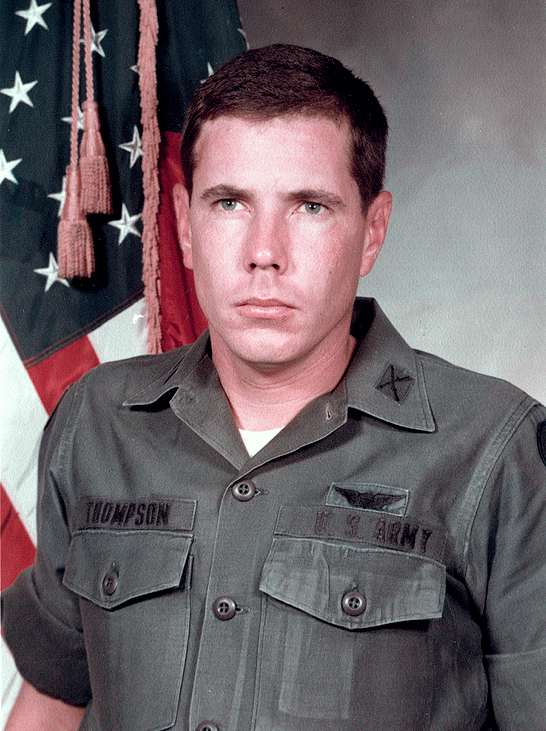
- Thompson in 1966
- Born: Hugh Clowers Thompson Jr. April 15, 1943; Atlanta, Georgia, U.S.
- Died: January 6, 2006 (aged 62); Pineville, Louisiana, U.S.
- Military career
- Allegiance: United States
- Branch: United States Navy; United States Army
- Service years: 1961–1964 (Navy); 1966–1983 (Army)
- Rank: Major
- Units: Naval Mobile Construction Battalions; 23rd Infantry Division
- Conflicts: Vietnam War; Tet Counteroffensive; Mỹ Lai massacre
- Awards: Soldier's Medal; Distinguished Flying Cross; Air Medal

Hugh Clowers Thompson Jr. (April 15, 1943 – January 6, 2006) was a United States Army helicopter pilot, serving as a warrant officer in the 123rd Aviation Battalion of the 23rd Infantry Division. He is credited with ending the Mỹ Lai massacre of the South Vietnamese village known as Sơn Mỹ on March 16, 1968, alongside Glenn Andreotta and Lawrence Colburn.

During the massacre, Thompson and his Hiller OH-23 Raven crew, Andreotta and Colburn, stopped many killings by threatening and blocking American officers and enlisted soldiers of Company C, 1st Battalion, 20th Infantry Regiment, 11th Brigade, 23rd Infantry Division. Additionally, Thompson and his crew saved a number of Vietnamese civilians by personally escorting them away from advancing United States Army ground units and assuring their evacuation by air. Thompson reported the atrocities by radio several times while at Sơn Mỹ. Although these reports reached Task Force Barker operational headquarters, nothing was done to stop the massacre. After evacuating a child to a Quảng Ngãi hospital, Thompson angrily reported to his superiors at Task Force Barker headquarters that a massacre was occurring at Sơn Mỹ. Immediately following Thompson's report, Lieutenant Colonel Frank A. Barker ordered all ground units in Sơn Mỹ to cease search and destroy operations in the village.

In 1970, Thompson testified against those responsible for the Mỹ Lai massacre. Twenty-six officers and enlisted soldiers, including William Calley and Ernest Medina, were charged with criminal offenses; many were either acquitted or pardoned, notably excepting Calley, who was convicted and served a commuted sentence of three-and-a-half years under house arrest. Thompson was condemned and ostracized by many individuals in the United States military and government, as well as the public, for his role in the investigations and trials concerning the Mỹ Lai massacre. As a result of what he experienced, Thompson experienced post-traumatic stress disorder, alcoholism, divorce, and severe nightmare disorder. Despite the adversity he faced, he remained in the Army until November 1, 1983, then continued to make a living as a helicopter pilot in the Southeastern United States.

In 1998, 30 years after the massacre, Thompson and the two other members of his crew, Andreotta and Colburn, were awarded the Soldier's Medal (Andreotta posthumously), the United States Army's highest award for bravery not involving direct contact with the enemy. Thompson and Colburn returned to Sơn Mỹ to meet with survivors of the massacre at the Sơn Mỹ Memorial in 1998. In 1999, Thompson and Colburn received the Peace Abbey Courage of Conscience Award.

== Early life ==
Hugh Clowers Thompson Jr. was born on April 15, 1943, in Atlanta, Georgia, to Wessie and Hugh Clowers Thompson. His family was from the Province of Georgia and Great Britain. He identified his paternal grandmother as being of Cherokee descent.

Hugh Clowers Thompson Sr. was an electrician and served in the United States Navy during the Second World War.

In 1946, the Thompson family relocated from Atlanta to Stone Mountain, Georgia. Thompson's brother and only sibling, Tommie Norman Thompson, was born in 1938 and served in the United States Air Force during the Vietnam War. Thompson was a member of the Boy Scouts of America and his family was actively involved in the Episcopal Church. Hugh Clowers Thompson Sr. educated his children to act with discipline and integrity. The Thompson family denounced racism and ethnic discrimination in the United States and assisted many ethnic minority families in their community. Coming from a working-class family, Hugh Clowers Thompson Jr. plowed fields and later worked as an assistant for a funeral mortuary to support his family during his adolescence.

Thompson graduated from Stone Mountain High School on June 5, 1961. Following graduation, Thompson enlisted in the United States Navy and served in a naval mobile construction battalion at Naval Air Station Atlanta, Georgia, as a heavy equipment operator. Thompson married Palma Baughman in 1963. In 1964, Thompson received an honorable discharge from the Navy and returned to Stone Mountain to live a quiet life and raise a family with his wife. He studied mortuary science and became a licensed funeral director.

When the Vietnam War began, Thompson felt obliged to return to military service. In 1966, Thompson enlisted in the United States Army and completed the Warrant Officer Flight Program training at Fort Wolters, Texas, and Fort Rucker, Alabama. In late-December 1967, at the age of 25, Thompson was ordered to Vietnam and assigned to Company B, 123rd Aviation Battalion of the 23rd Infantry Division.

== Mỹ Lai massacre intervention ==
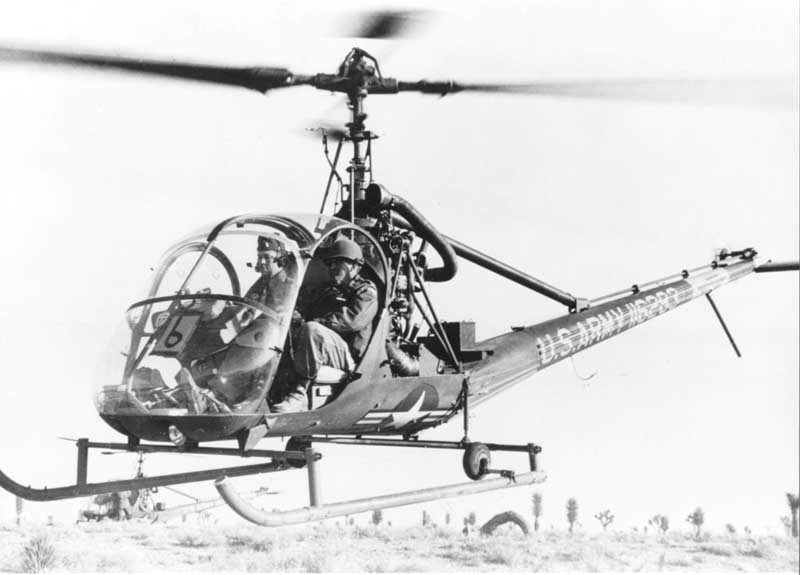
Hiller OH-23 Raven, three-seat, light observation helicopter, similar to the one Thompson commanded during the massacre

On March 16, 1968, Thompson and his Hiller OH-23 Raven observation helicopter crew, Lawrence Colburn (gunner) and Glenn Andreotta (crew chief), were ordered to support Task Force Barker's search and destroy operations in Sơn Mỹ, Quảng Ngãi Province, South Vietnam. Song My Village was composed of four hamlets, Mỹ Lai, Mỹ Khê, Cổ Lũy and Tư Cung, and was suspected by the United States Army Military Intelligence Corps to be a Viet Cong stronghold.

Army intelligence concerning the presence of Viet Cong in Sơn Mỹ was inaccurate, however, and the village's population was predominately composed of neutral, unarmed rice-farming families. Reconnaissance aircraft, including Thompson's OH-23 crew, flew over the Sơn Mỹ vicinity but received no enemy fire. At 07:30, following a short artillery and helicopter gunship barrage, Company C (Charlie Company), 1st Battalion, 20th Infantry Regiment of Task Force Barker, led by Captain Ernest Medina, was landed by helicopters and moved into Sơn Mỹ.

Upon entering Sơn Mỹ, officers and soldiers of Company C moved through the Song My Village and vicinity, murdering civilians, raping women, and setting fire to huts. 1st Platoon of Company C, commanded by Lieutenant William Calley, forced approximately 70–80 villagers, mostly women and children, into an irrigation ditch and murdered the civilians with knives, bayonets, grenades, and small arms fire.

Thompson recounted at an academic conference on Mỹ Lai held at Tulane University in December 1994: "We kept flying back and forth, reconning in front and in the rear, and it didn't take very long until we started noticing the large number of bodies everywhere. Everywhere we'd look, we'd see bodies. These were infants, two-, three-, four-, five-year-olds, women, very old men, no draft-age people whatsoever."

Thompson and his crew, who at first thought the artillery bombardment caused all the civilian deaths on the ground, became aware that Americans were murdering the villagers after a wounded civilian woman they requested medical evacuation for, Nguyễn Thị Tẩu (chín Tẩu), was murdered right in front of them by Captain Medina, the commanding officer of the operation. According to Lawrence Colburn,

Then we saw a young girl about twenty years old lying on the grass. We could see that she was unarmed and wounded in the chest. We marked her with smoke because we saw a squad not too far away. The smoke was green, meaning it's safe to approach. Red would have meant the opposite. We were hovering six feet off the ground not more than twenty feet away when Captain Medina came over, kicked her, stepped back, and finished her off. He did it right in front of us. When we saw Medina do that, it clicked. It was our guys doing the killing.

Immediately after the execution, Thompson discovered the irrigation ditch full of Calley's victims. Thompson then radioed a message to accompanying gunships and Task Force Barker headquarters, "It looks to me like there's an awful lot of unnecessary killing going on down there. Something ain't right about this. There's bodies everywhere. There's a ditch full of bodies that we saw. There's something wrong here." Thompson spotted movement in the irrigation ditch, indicating that there were civilians alive in it. He immediately landed to assist the victims. Lieutenant Calley approached Thompson and the two exchanged an uneasy conversation.

Thompson: What's going on here, Lieutenant?

Calley: This is my business.

Thompson: What is this? Who are these people?

Calley: Just following orders.

Thompson: Orders? Whose orders?

Calley: Just following...

Thompson: But, these are human beings, unarmed civilians, sir.

Calley: Look Thompson, this is my show. I'm in charge here. It ain't your concern.

Thompson: Yeah, great job.

Calley: You better get back in that chopper and mind your own business.

Thompson: You ain't heard the last of this!

As Thompson was speaking to Calley, Calley's subordinate, Sergeant David Mitchell, fired into the irrigation ditch, killing any civilians still moving. Thompson and his crew, in disbelief and shock, returned to their helicopter and began searching for civilians they could save. They spotted a group of women, children, and old men in the northeast corner of the village fleeing from advancing soldiers from the 2nd Platoon, Company C. Immediately realizing that the soldiers intended to murder the Vietnamese civilians, Thompson landed his helicopter between the advancing ground unit and the villagers. He turned to Colburn and Andreotta and ordered them to shoot the men of the 2nd Platoon if they attempted to kill any of the civilians. Thompson then dismounted to confront 2nd Platoon's leader, Lieutenant Stephen Brooks. Thompson told him he wanted help getting the civilians out of the bunker:

Thompson: Hey listen, hold your fire. I'm going to try to get these people out of this bunker. Just hold your men here.

Brooks: Yeah, we can help you get 'em out of that bunker – with a hand grenade!

Thompson: Just hold your men here. I think I can do better than that.

Brooks declined to argue with him, even though as a commissioned officer he outranked Thompson. After coaxing the 11 Vietnamese out of the bunker, Thompson persuaded the pilots of the two UH-1 Huey gunships (Dan Millians and Brian Livingstone) flying as his escort to evacuate them. (Gunships would ordinarily never land in a combat zone.) While Thompson was returning to base to refuel, Andreotta spotted movement in an irrigation ditch filled with approximately 100 bodies. The helicopter again landed and the men dismounted to search for survivors. After wading through the remains of the dead and dying men, women and children, Andreotta extracted a live boy, Do Ba. According to Trent Angers in The Forgotten Hero of My Lai: The Hugh Thompson Story (2014),

The helicopter looped around then set down quickly near the edge of the ditch. Andreotta had maintained visual contact with the spot where he saw the movement, and he darted out of the aircraft as soon as it touched the ground. Thompson got out and guarded one side of the chopper and Colburn guarded the other. Andreotta had to walk on several badly mangled bodies to get where he was going. He lifted a corpse with several bullet holes in the torso and there, lying under it, was a child, age five or six, covered in blood and obviously in a state of shock.

Do Ba was pulled from the irrigation ditch and after failing to find any more survivors, Thompson's crew transported the child to the ARVN hospital in Quảng Ngãi where he left the child under the care of a nun. After transporting the child to the hospital, Thompson flew to the Task Force Barker headquarters (Landing Zone Dottie), and angrily reported the massacre to his superiors. His report quickly reached Lieutenant Colonel Frank Barker, the operation's overall commander. Barker immediately radioed ground forces to cease the "killings". After the helicopter was refueled, Thompson's crew returned to the village to ensure that no more civilians were being murdered and that the wounded were evacuated.

=== After the massacre ===
Thompson made an official report of the killings and was interviewed by Colonel Oran Henderson, the commander of the 11th Infantry Brigade (the parent organization of the 20th Infantry). Concerned, senior American Division officers cancelled similar planned operations by Task Force Barker against other villages (Mỹ Lai 5, Mỹ Lai 1, etc.) in Quảng Ngãi Province, possibly preventing the additional massacre of further hundreds, if not thousands, of Vietnamese civilians.

Initially, commanders throughout the American chain of command were successful in covering up the Mỹ Lai massacre. Thompson quickly received the Distinguished Flying Cross for his actions at Mỹ Lai. The citation for the award fabricated events, for example praising Thompson for taking to a hospital a Vietnamese child "...caught in intense crossfire". It also stated that his "...sound judgment had greatly enhanced Vietnamese–American relations in the operational area". Thompson threw away the citation.

Thompson continued to fly observation missions in the OH-23 and was hit by enemy fire a total of eight times. In four of those instances, his aircraft was lost. In the last incident, his helicopter was brought down by enemy machine-gun fire, and he broke his back in the resulting crash landing. This ended his combat career in Vietnam. He was evacuated to a hospital in Japan and began a long period of rehabilitation.

When news of the massacre publicly broke, Thompson repeated his account to then-Colonel William Wilson and then-Lieutenant General William Peers during their official Pentagon investigations. In late-1969, Thompson was summoned to Washington, DC to appear before a special closed hearing of the House Armed Services Committee. There, he was sharply criticized by congressmen, in particular Chairman Mendel Rivers (D-S.C.), who wanted to play down allegations of a massacre by American troops. Rivers publicly stated that he felt Thompson was the only soldier at Mỹ Lai who should be punished (for turning his weapons on fellow American troops) and unsuccessfully attempted to have him court-martialed.

Thompson was vilified by many Americans for his testimony against United States Army personnel. He recounted in a CBS 60 Minutes television program in 2004, "I'd received death threats over the phone... Dead animals on your porch, mutilated animals on your porch some mornings when you get up."

After his Vietnam service, Thompson was assigned to Fort Rucker to become an instructor pilot and later received a direct commission, attaining the rank of captain and retired as a major. His other military assignments included Fort Jackson, South Korea, Fort Ord, Fort Hood and bases in Hawaii. He retired from the army in 1983.

== Post-military life ==
Thompson became a helicopter pilot for the oil industry, operating in the Gulf of Mexico. In 1988 an English documentary film producer, Michael Bilton, working for Yorkshire Television, managed to contact Thompson via his mother, who was then widowed and living in Texas. At that point Thompson had all but disappeared from public life. Bilton had contacted former crew member Colburn, and put Thompson and Colburn in touch with each other after a gap of nearly 16 years. Both Thompson and Colburn had been trying to find each other, but without success. Thompson was living in Lafayette, Louisiana, and Colburn near Atlanta, Georgia. They quickly arranged a reunion. Bilton spent a long weekend with Thompson discussing the events at Mỹ Lai. It proved the beginning of a long friendship which lasted until Thompson's death.

Both Thompson and Colburn were interviewed for the film Four Hours in My Lai (1989) (Remember My Lai? on PBS) – which went on to win a British Academy Award and an international Emmy award. The interview showed Thompson relating what he had witnessed at Mỹ Lai: "Here we were supposed to be the guys in the white hats. It upset me". Bilton and his colleague Kevin Sim then began researching a book and Bilton conducted further interviews with Thompson and Colburn. When the book Four Hours in My Lai (1992) was published, it prompted a campaign to have the heroism of Thompson and his helicopter crew recognized. Several senior figures in the U.S. military supported the campaign, as did President George H. W. Bush. Thompson and Colburn were invited to speak to a wide range of audiences about the ethics of warfare including at West Point, a conference in Norway, and at Connecticut College in New London, where they were each awarded an honorary doctorate.

In 1998, Thompson and Colburn returned to the village of Sơn Mỹ, where they met some of the people they saved during the killings, including Thi Nhung and Pham Thi Nhanh, two women who had been part of the group about to be killed by Brooks's 2nd Platoon. Thompson said to the survivors, "I just wish our crew that day could have helped more people than we did." He reported that one of the women they had helped out came up to him and asked, "Why didn't the people who committed these acts come back with you?" He said that he was "just devastated" but that she finished her sentence: "So we could forgive them." He later told a reporter, "I'm not man enough to do that. I'm sorry. I wish I was, but I won't lie to anybody. I'm not that much of a man." Thompson and Colburn lit incense sticks and placed them in an urn by a stone marker at the irrigation ditch where many were murdered. They also dedicated a new elementary school for the children of the village.

Thompson later served as a counselor in the Louisiana Department of Veterans Affairs, and gave a talk at the United States Naval Academy in 2003 and at West Point in 2005 on Professional Military Ethics. He also spoke at the United States Air Force Academy and to United States Marine Corps officers at Quantico. Thompson gave his first lecture to a U.S. Army audience, discussing physical and moral courage, at the U.S. Army Medical Department Center and School, Ft. Sam Houston, Texas, in 1998. Thompson and his crew's actions have been used as an example in the ethics manuals of U.S. and European militaries. Thompson received an honorary degree from Emory University and The Stuart A. Rose Manuscript, Archives, and Rare Book Library at Emory University holds a collection relating to the life and careers of Hugh Thompson and Lawrence Colburn. In 2005, he retired from Louisiana Veterans Affairs.

== Recognition for actions at Mỹ Lai ==
In 1998, exactly 30 years after the massacre, Thompson, Andreotta, and Colburn were awarded the Soldier's Medal (Andreotta posthumously), the United States Army's highest award for bravery not involving direct contact with the enemy. "It was the ability to do the right thing even at the risk of their personal safety that guided these soldiers to do what they did", then-Major General Michael Ackerman said at the 1998 ceremony. The three "set the standard for all soldiers to follow". Additionally on March 10, 1998, Senator Max Cleland (D-GA.) entered a tribute to Thompson, Colburn and Andreotta into the record of the U.S. Senate. Cleland said the three men were "true examples of American patriotism at its finest".

In 1999, Thompson and Colburn received the Peace Abbey Courage of Conscience Award. Later that year, both men served as co-chairs of STONEWALK, a group who pulled a one-ton rock engraved "Unknown Civilians Killed in War" from Boston to Arlington National Cemetery. In 2010, the Hugh Thompson Foundation was chartered in memory of Thompson's courage in halting the massacre. His biography The Forgotten Hero of My Lai: The Hugh Thompson Story by Trent Angers was included on the U.S. Army Chief of Staff's professional reading list.

Folk singer David Rovics wrote a song about the incident at Mỹ Lai titled "Song for Hugh Thompson". Ryan Costello of The Oaks wrote a song commemorating Hugh Thompson's heroism in For Hugh Thompson, Who Stood Alone on the album Our Fathers and the Things They Left Behind. Thom Parrott (also known as Tom Parrott) wrote the song "Pinkville Helicopter" about the massacre that is included on the Smithsonian Folkways CD collection Best of Broadside. Jonathan Berger composed a piano concerto dedicated to Hugh Thompson. Commissioned by the National Endowment for the Arts, it was premiered at the United Nations General Assembly on January 24, 2001. A subsequent solo piano work, Elegy for the Victims of My Lai, adapted from the concerto was recorded and performed by pianist Sasha Toperich. The Kronos Quartet used Berger's music along with a libretto by Harriet Scott Chessman to compose a "monodrama" with tenor Rinde Eckert. Along with the strings of the quartet and various Vietnamese instruments played by the musician Van-Anh Vo, Eckert sang about Thompson's encounter with the massacre and the effect of the encounter on himself. The composition was presented at the Brooklyn Academy of Music in September 2017.

== Death ==
At the age of 62, after extensive treatment for cancer, Thompson was removed from life support and died on January 6, 2006, at the Veterans Affairs Medical Center in Pineville, Louisiana. Colburn came from Atlanta to be at his bedside. Thompson was buried in Lafayette, Louisiana, with full military honors, including a three-volley salute and a helicopter flyover. On February 8, Congressman Charles Boustany made a statement in Congress honoring Thompson, stating that the "United States has lost a true hero, and the State of Louisiana has lost a devoted leader and dear friend."

== See also ==
- Seymour Hersh
- Silas Soule
