= Oran Henderson =

American army officer

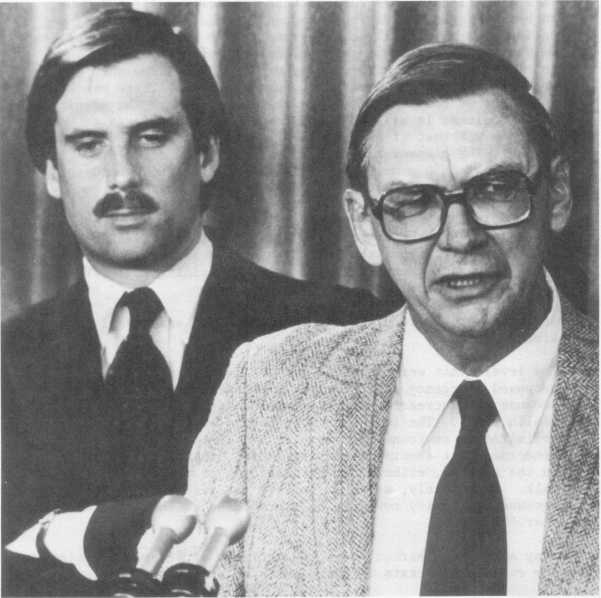
- Oran Henderson (right) while serving as Pennsylvania's civil defense director in 1979.
- Born: Oran Kenneth Henderson; August 25, 1920; Indianapolis, Indiana, United States
- Died: June 2, 1998 (aged 77); Lebanon, Pennsylvania, United States
- Burial place: Indiantown Gap National Cemetery, East Hanover Township, Lebanon County, Pennsylvania, United States
- Military career
- Allegiance: United States of America
- Branch: United States Army
- Service years: 1939–1974
- Rank: Colonel
- Unit: Infantry Branch
- Commands: 11th Infantry Brigade, 23rd Infantry Division
- Conflicts: World War II; Korean War; Vietnam War
- Awards: Silver Star (5); Legion of Merit (2); Bronze Star (5); Purple Heart (4)

Oran Kenneth Henderson (August 25, 1920 – June 2, 1998) was a United States Army colonel, and war criminal, who commanded the 11th Infantry Brigade, 23rd Infantry Division during the Vietnam War and later served as head of the Pennsylvania Emergency Management Agency in the late 1970s. He is most infamous for his role in the My Lai massacre where he served as brigade commander for the units involved in the killings, ultimately being charged and acquitted of dereliction of duty for failing to carry out an adequate investigation and lying to Army investigators. He was the highest-ranking Army officer to be tried in connection with the killings. Prior to the Vietnam War, Henderson had served as an infantry officer in World War II and the Korean War.

== Early life and education ==
Henderson was born on August 25, 1920, in Indianapolis, Indiana. He enlisted in the Army on April 12, 1939, and was commissioned as a second lieutenant on January 7, 1943. Henderson served in World War II and the Korean War as an infantry officer, being wounded in both conflicts. He graduated from the Army Command and General Staff College in 1953 and the Armed Forces Staff College in 1959, and then completed a B.S. degree at the University of Maryland in 1962.

== My Lai and trial ==
On 16 March 1968, Henderson took over as commander for the 11th Infantry Brigade. He would oversee a battalion-sized operation to clear Viet Cong forces from the Sơn Tịnh District, ordering his men to "go in there aggressively, close with the enemy and wipe them out for good". During the operation, soldiers under his command massacred hundreds of unarmed South Vietnamese civilians near the village of Sơn Mỹ in what would later be known as the My Lai massacre. At the time of the massacre, Henderson was flying over the villages in a helicopter. Henderson was the first to interview Warrant Officer (WO1) Hugh Thompson, Jr., a helicopter pilot who had intervened in the massacre and issued an official report describing what he saw. Despite the report, Henderson issued a commendation for Captain Ernest Medina, the commander of one of the companies involved in the killings and even after interviewing several soldiers involved in the operation, issued a report stating only twenty civilians had been inadvertently killed by artillery fire. In his report, Henderson called widespread reports that hundreds of civilians had been killed "propaganda" to discredit U.S. and ARVN forces.

In 1970, three charges were brought against Henderson including failing to carry out a thorough investigation of the killings, failing to report possible atrocities to his division commander Brigadier General Samuel W. Koster, and lying to a Pentagon inquiry. In the case, Henderson's defense counsel argued that he had conducted an honest investigation but was misled by his subordinates including Captain Medina while prosecutors contended he hid evidence in order to preserve his rank and command. On 18 December 1971, after a 62-day trial in Fort George G. Meade which heard 106 witnesses, Henderson was acquitted by a jury of two generals and five colonels. After his acquittal, he stated that the verdict "reaffirms the confidence any Army man can have in the military system."

== Later life ==
After leaving the Army in 1974, Henderson became head of the Pennsylvania Emergency Management Agency, where he oversaw responses to devastating floods in 1977 and the Three Mile Island accident. He recommended a 10 miles (16 km) radius evacuation in response and later testified to Congress regarding the incident.

== Death ==
Henderson died of pancreatic cancer on June 2, 1998, in Lebanon, Pennsylvania.
