= Terry Nelson (musician) =

American DJ

Terry Nelson Skinner (August 24, 1943 – November 14, 2014) was an American disc jockey from Russellville, Alabama, United States.

Terry's musical career began as a member of the Terry Teens duo with a fellow Hackleberg High School student whose last name was Terry. The Teens dressed in matching red jackets and black pants, performing songs by the Everly Brothers. They entered the Marion County 4-H Club Talent Show around 1960 and blew away the competition accompanied by screaming girls from their local fanbase. They continued to perform as the Terry Teens while attending Florence State University (now the University of North Alabama).

Together with a group of studio musicians, Nelson released a single in 1971 under the name C. Company featuring Terry Nelson. The single, entitled "Battle Hymn of Lt. Calley", was a spoken-word recording with a musical background which defended William Calley and the massacre at My Lai, for which Calley was court-martialed in 1970–71. Originally issued on a small local label, Quickit Records, it was reissued nationally on Plantation Records in April 1971. The single reached No. 37 on the Billboard Hot 100 charts and No. 49 on Hot Country Songs.

This disc sold over one million copies in just four days, and received a gold disc awarded by the Recording Industry Association of America on 15 April 1971. It went on to sell nearly two million copies.

That same year, C. Company and Terry Nelson released an album, Wake Up America, also on Plantation.

The group's name derived from William Calley's unit, C Company, 1st Battalion, 20th Infantry Regiment, 11th Infantry Brigade, 23rd Infantry Division (Americal).

== Bibliography ==
- Joel Whitburn, The Billboard Book of Top 40 Hits. 7th edn, 2000, ISBN 978-0823082803
