= Landing Zone Dottie =

U.S. Army firebase in Quảng Ngãi province

Site information
- Type: Army
- Condition: abandoned

Location
- Coordinates: 15.2378°N 108.787°E

Site history
- Built: 1968
- In use: 1968-71
- Battles/wars: Vietnam War

Garrison information
- Occupants: 11th Infantry Brigade

Landing Zone Dottie (also known as Firebase Binh Lien, Nui Dong Le and Hill 102) is a former U.S. Army firebase in Quảng Ngãi province, Vietnam.

== History ==
The base served as the headquarters of the 11th Infantry Brigade, 23rd Infantry Division from its arrival in South Vietnam in December 1967 until its departure in October 1971.

It was from Dottie that Task Force Barker deployed by helicopter to Sơn Mỹ village where they conducted the Mỹ Lai massacre on 16 March 1968.

When U.S. forces withdrew in October 1971 they burned most of the base over a four day period, destroying any items that could be of use to the Vietcong or local South Vietnamese villagers and bulldozed the bunkers and trenches.

Following the departure of U.S. forces, a small Army of the Republic of Vietnam (ARVN) Regional Force unit and a battery of the 23rd Artillery Battalion occupied part of the base.
