= Glenn Andreotta =

US Army soldier and helicopter crew chief (1947–1968)

Glenn Urban Andreotta
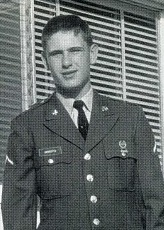
- Glenn Andreotta in 1966
- Born: October 30, 1947; Newton, New Jersey, U.S.
- Died: April 8, 1968 (aged 20) near Quảng Ngãi, Quảng Ngãi Province, South Vietnam
- Military career
- Allegiance: United States of America
- Branch: United States Army
- Service years: 1966–1968
- Rank: Specialist 4
- Unit: 161st Assault Helicopter Company
- Conflicts: Vietnam War †
- Awards: Bronze Star; Soldier's Medal

Glenn Urban Andreotta (October 30, 1947 – April 8, 1968) was an American helicopter crew chief in the Vietnam War noted for being one of three who intervened in the Mỹ Lai massacre, in which 504 unarmed children, women and men were murdered.

== Early life and enlistment ==
Glenn Andreotta was of Italian descent. He was born in Newton, New Jersey, and raised in St. Louis, Missouri. He dropped out of high school in his junior year and enlisted in the United States Army. He then served a one-year tour of duty in Vietnam as a radio repairman. Beginning his second tour on November 12, 1967, he was assigned to the 161st Assault Helicopter Company, holding the rank of Specialist Four. Serving as a crew chief aboard an OH-23 Raven observation helicopter, his pilot was Warrant Officer One Hugh Thompson, Jr. and his door-gunner was Specialist Four Lawrence Colburn, both of whom would also be acclaimed for their heroism at My Lai.

== My Lai Massacre ==
In the early morning hours of March 16, 1968, Andreotta's OH-23 encountered no enemy fire over My Lai 4. Spotting two possible Viet Cong suspects, Thompson forced the Vietnamese men to surrender and flew them off for a tactical interrogation. He also marked the location of several wounded Vietnamese with green smoke, a signal that they needed help.

Returning to the My Lai area at around 0900 after refueling, the crew noticed that the people they had marked were now dead. Out in a paddy field beside a dike 200 meters south of the village, they marked the location of a wounded young Vietnamese woman. Thompson and his crew watched from a low hover as Captain Ernest Medina (C Company Commander, 1st Battalion, 20th Infantry Regiment) came up to the woman, prodded her with his foot, and then shot and killed her.

Thompson then flew over an irrigation ditch filled with dozens of bodies. Shocked at the sight, he radioed his accompanying gunships, knowing his transmission would be monitored by many on the net: "It looks to me like there's an awful lot of unnecessary killing going on down there. Something ain't right about this. There's bodies everywhere. There's a ditch full of bodies that we saw. There's something wrong here."

Movement from the ditch indicated to Thompson that there were still people alive in there. Thompson landed his helicopter and dismounted. David Mitchell, a sergeant and squad leader in 1st Platoon, C Company, walked over to him. When asked by Thompson whether any help could be provided to the people in the ditch, the sergeant replied that the only way to help them was to put them out of their misery. Second Lieutenant William Calley (1st Platoon Leader, C Company) then came up, and the two had the following conversation:

Thompson: What's going on here, Lieutenant?
Calley: This is my business.
Thompson: What is this? Who are these people?
Calley: Just following orders.
Thompson: Orders? Whose orders?
Calley: Just following...
Thompson: But, these are human beings, unarmed civilians, sir.
Calley: Look Thompson, this is my show. I'm in charge here. It ain't your concern.
Thompson: Yeah, great job.
Calley: You better get back in that chopper and mind your own business.
Thompson: You ain't heard the last of this!

Thompson took off again, and Andreotta reported that Mitchell was now executing the people in the ditch. Furious, Thompson flew over the northeast corner of the village and spotted a group of about ten civilians, including children, running toward a homemade bomb shelter. Pursuing them were soldiers from the 2nd Platoon, C Company. Realizing that the soldiers intended to murder the Vietnamese, Thompson landed his aircraft between them and the villagers. Thompson turned to Colburn and Andreotta and told them that if the Americans began shooting at the villagers or him, they should fire their M60 machine guns at the Americans: "Y'all cover me! If these bastards open up on me or these people, you open up on them. Promise me!" Thompson then dismounted to confront the 2nd Platoon's leader, Stephen Brooks. Thompson told him he wanted help getting the civilians out of the bunker:

Thompson: Hey listen, hold your fire. I'm going to try to get these people out of this bunker. Just hold your men here.
Brooks: Yeah, we can help you get 'em out of that bunker - with a hand grenade!
Thompson: Just hold your men here. I think I can do better than that.

Brooks declined to argue with him, even though as a commissioned officer he outranked Thompson.

After coaxing the 11 Vietnamese out of the bunker, Thompson persuaded the pilots of the two UH-1 Huey gunships (Dan Millians and Brian Livingstone) flying as his escort to evacuate them. While Thompson was returning to base to refuel, Andreotta spotted movement in an irrigation ditch filled with approximately 100 bodies. The helicopter again landed and the men dismounted to search for survivors. After wading through the remains of the dead and dying men, women and children, Andreotta extracted a live boy, Do Ba, and handed him up to Colburn and Thompson. As Thompson described it:

"Glenn Andreotta—if there was a hero, I don't like that word, but if there was a hero at My Lai—it was Glenn Andreotta, because he saw movement in that ditch, and he fixed in on this one little kid and went down into that ditch. I would not want to go in that ditch. It's not pretty. It was very bad. I can imagine what was going through his mind down there, because there was more than one still alive—people grabbing hold of his pants, wanting help. "I can't help you. You're too bad [off]." He found this one kid and brought the kid back up and handed it to Larry, and we laid it across Larry and my lap and took him out of there. I remember thinking Glenn Andreotta put himself where nobody in their right mind would want to be, and he was driven by something. I haven't got the aircraft on the ground real stable. He bolted out of that aircraft into this ditch. Now he was a hero. Glenn Andreotta gave his life for his country about three weeks later. That's the kind of guy he was, and he was a hero that day."

Thompson flew the survivor to the ARVN hospital in Quang Ngai.

Upon returning to their base at about 1100, Thompson heatedly reported the massacre to his superiors. His allegations of civilian killings quickly reached Lieutenant Colonel Frank Barker, the operation's overall commander. Barker radioed his executive officer to find out from Captain Medina what was happening on the ground. Medina then gave the cease-fire order to Charlie Company to "knock off the killing".

== After the massacre ==
Andreotta was killed shortly after the events at My Lai while serving in B Company (the "Warlords") of the 123rd Aviation Battalion of the Americal Division (the 161st Assault Helicopter Company had been reorganized into the 123rd Battalion in January 1968). On April 8 he was serving as the door gunner aboard OH-23 helicopter 62-03813, along with crew chief Specialist Five Charles M. Dutton and pilot First Lieutenant Barry Lloyd.

Viet Cong activity was reported 10 kilometers (6.2 miles) southwest of Quảng Ngãi, and their scout helicopter was ordered to accompany two gunships to that location and flush out and destroy the enemy. Andreotta was killed outright by small-arms fire from the ground, a single shot to his head. Then a North Vietnamese 12.7 mm anti-aircraft machine gun began firing on the scout, destroying both the swashplate and control panel. Dutton was covered in burning avgas when the craft finally hit the ground, and a North Vietnamese soldier ran towards the wreckage and shot him, before retreating, leaving a wounded Lloyd lying in shock where he had been thrown from the impact. He was rescued by Warrant Officer One Michael Banek's UH-1 Huey and taken to Chu Lai. The helicopter was officially declared "Destroyed by Fire" by the US Military on April 11, although both Andreotta's and Dutton's bodies were recovered.

Soon after he was killed by hostile fire, Andreotta received a posthumous Bronze Star for his part in rescuing children at My Lai. The citation falsified what happened at My Lai by saying the children had been "hiding in a bunker located between friendly forces and hostile forces engaged in a heavy firefight." It went on to say "Andreotta's willingness to risk his life for innocent children and his bravery in action reflect great credit upon himself, his unit, the Americal Division, and the United States Army." Hugh Thompson's signature was forged on the eyewitness report. Andreotta received a posthumous Courage of Conscience Award for his unusual bravery and compassion in helping, along with helicopter crewmen Hugh C. Thompson Jr. and Lawrence Coburn, to save civilian lives during the My Lai massacre in Vietnam in 1968.

Andreotta was posthumously awarded the Soldier's Medal in 1998 for his bravery in stopping the My Lai Massacre, along with Lawrence Colburn and Hugh Thompson, Jr. Since his mother was in ill health at the time, she accepted his award at her home at a later date. "It was the ability to do the right thing even at the risk of their personal safety that guided these soldiers to do what they did," then-Major General Michael Ackerman said at the ceremony. The three "set the standard for all soldiers to follow." Additionally on March 10, 1998, Senator Max Cleland (D-GA) entered a tribute to Thompson, Colburn and Andreotta into the record of the U.S. Senate. Cleland said the three men were "true examples of American patriotism at its finest."

His name appears on the Vietnam Veterans Memorial Wall on panel 48E, line 50. In 1999, his name was among nearly a million sent aboard the Stardust spacecraft.
