= Operation Muscatine =

Part of the Vietnam War (1967–1968)

- Part of the Vietnam War
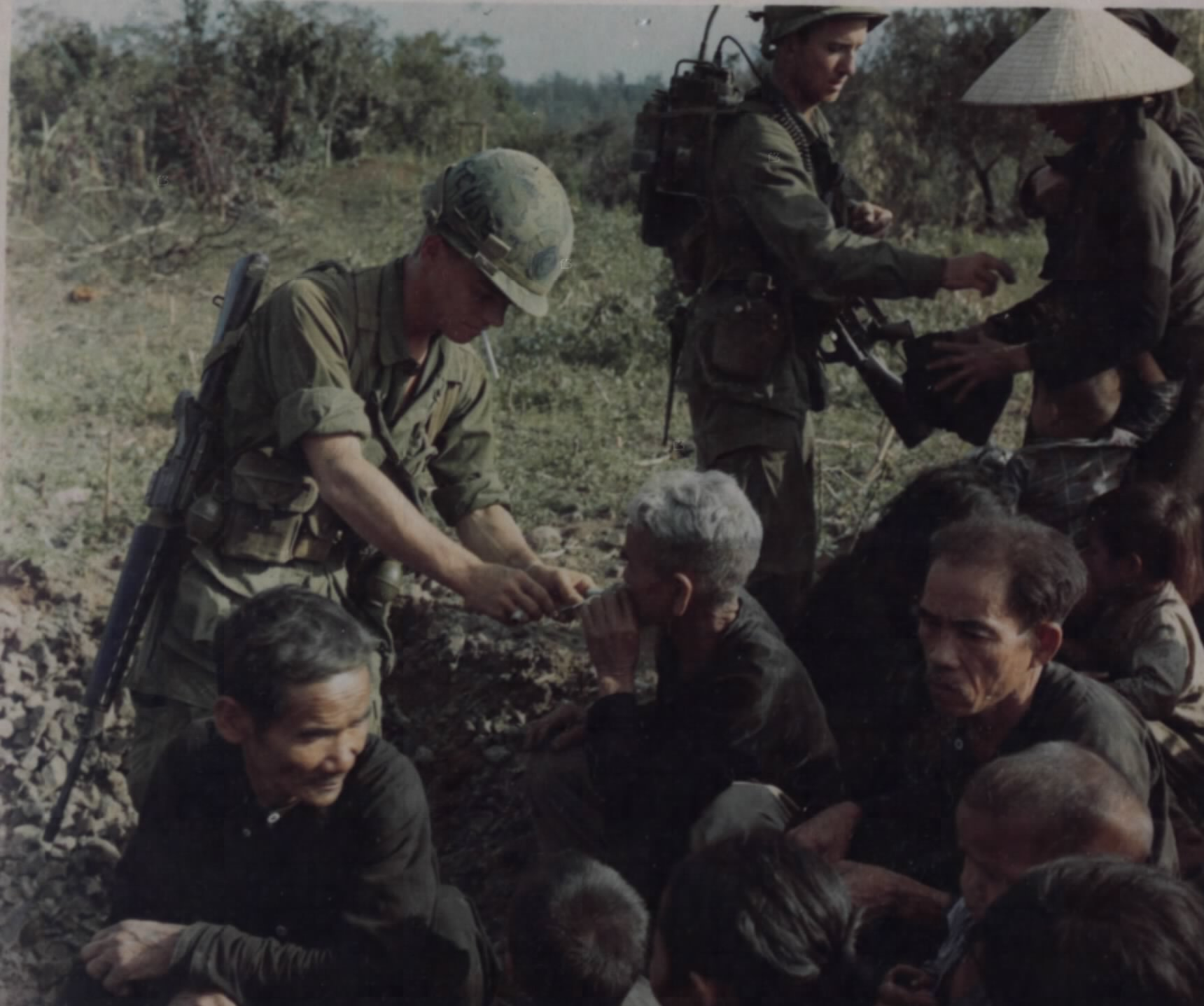
- Vietnamese detainees during Operation Muscatine
Date	18 December 1967 – 10 June 1968
Location	Quảng Ngãi Province, South Vietnam
Result	US claims operational success

Belligerents
United States	Viet Cong

Units involved
3rd Brigade, 4th Infantry Division; 196th Infantry Brigade; 198th Infantry Brigade; 11th Infantry Brigade	406th Sapper Battalion; 83rd Local Force Battalion; 48th Local Force Battalion

Casualties and losses
25 killed	US body count: 645+ killed 7 captured
- 347-504 civilians killed in the My Lai Massacre

Operation Muscatine was a security operation conducted during the Vietnam War by the US Army in Quảng Ngãi Province, South Vietnam from 18 December 1967 to 10 June 1968. During this operation on 16 March 1968 the 1st Battalion, 20th Infantry Regiment and the 4th Battalion, 3rd Infantry Regiment carried out the My Lai Massacre.

== Background ==
Operation Muscatine was a security mission to protect Chu Lai and the neighboring lowlands from several Viet Cong (VC) battalions, and to search for their camps in the hills that ran along the Quảng Tín–Quảng Ngãi border.

== Operation ==
The 3rd Brigade, 4th Infantry Division joined with the 196th Infantry Brigade to conduct the operation. The 196th Infantry Brigade moved north into the Quế Sơn Valley to join Operation Wheeler and was replaced by the 198th Infantry Brigade, which in turn handed over the operation to the newly arrived 11th Infantry Brigade.

By January 1968 the 198th Infantry Brigade continued the operation in Đức Phổ District with the 1st Battalion, 52nd Infantry Regiment, and elements of the 3rd Brigade, 4th Infantry Division. US soldiers suffered a steady stream of casualties from VC booby traps and mines, but rarely encountered the VC. Most of the mines came from bases abandoned by the South Vietnamese 2nd Marine Brigade who had departed the area without clearing their minefields.

On 1 January, elements of the Americal Division deployed to blocking positions in Quang Ngai province as troops from the Army of the Republic of Vietnam (ARVN) 2nd Division and U.S. helicopter gunships engaged a large enemy force, killing 111 and capturing 37 weapons. On the following day, the VC struck back, as the 406th and 38th Battalions and a pair of local force platoons penetrated the central pacification zone and attacked the headquarters of Quang Ngai's Nghia Hanh District. A VC deserter had alerted the defenders to the impending assault. Fully prepared, the South Vietnamese rebuffed the attack, killing 74 VC and capturing five prisoners and 20 weapons.

On 17 January, Company A, 1/52nd Infantry, caught up with four VC local force companies near the coastal village of Phu Nhieu in Quảng Tín Province, several kilometers south of Chu Lai. Reinforced by the battalion's Company B, the troops swept toward the village, while the 3rd Brigade's reconnaissance platoon and Company B, 1st Battalion, 14th Infantry Regiment, landed into blocking positions south and west of the town. As the attack progressed, VC who had sought refuge in the village fled into the blocking positions, where small arms fire and gunships cut them down. At a loss of one soldier killed and six wounded, the Americans claimed 100 VC dead, seven prisoners and 38 captured weapons. By the end of January the operation had resulted in 454 VC dead and 103 weapons captured at a cost of 25 US killed.

In February in the aftermath of the Tet Offensive the 4th Battalion, 3rd Infantry Regiment, continued the operation together with Task Force Barker, a group composed of three infantry companies and a partial artillery battery drawn from various parts of the 11th Infantry Brigade that was commanded by the brigade's operations officer, Lieutenant colonel Frank A. Barker. It patrolled a sector that lay northeast of Quảng Ngãi City and which included the Batangan Peninsula. Elements from the ARVN 2nd Division guarded the districts immediately surrounding Quảng Ngai City. The 3rd Battalion, 1st Infantry Regiment and the 1st Battalion, 20th Infantry Regiment, operated in the southeastern part of the province from the brigade headquarters at Duc Pho. The 11th Infantry Brigade, therefore, had a huge amount of territory to cover, a problem exacerbated by the fact that it was physically split in two by the ARVN zone.

In the wake of Tet, Allied units based near Quảng Ngai City searched the countryside for the enemy forces that had attacked the provincial capital. The VC had suffered tremendous casualties but would bounce back unless the experienced cadre that formed the nucleus of their units could be destroyed. ARVN troops and US gunships on 6 February killed 50 VC from the 406th Sapper Battalion southwest of Quảng Ngai City and another 92 soldiers from the 83rd Local Force Battalion near the same location the next day. The VC 48th Local Force Battalion proved more elusive. The unit typically operated out of the sprawling village of Son My, made up of over a dozen hamlets that dotted the lower coast of the Batangan Peninsula. The community of rice farmers and fisherman had been a Communist stronghold since its founding by Viet Minh supporters in 1945. Technically the area was in the ARVN zone of operations, but the government's repeated reluctance or inability to clear the area led the Allies to authorize Task Force Barker to enter Son My in search of the 48th Local Force Battalion. On US military maps, the area surrounding the largest of the settlements, My Lai (1), was colored pink to reflect its VC–controlled status. Before long, the men of Task Force Barker came to refer to the whole area as "Pinkville." Although there was some question as to whether the 48th Battalion was recovering from Tet in the village or in the hills to the northwest, Colonel Barker conducted regular sweeps through Son My looking for the unit. Whenever the soldiers from Task Force Barker did so, they faced a landscape that was filled with mines and booby traps. Snipers shot at them from concealment and then vanished without a trace. The Americans rarely caught a glimpse of their foes, in part because the area was riddled with tunnels that the local inhabitants had built to protect themselves and which the VC had turned to their own uses. The villagers, most of whom either actively supported the VC or else were too frightened to resist their demands, almost never warned the Americans when they were in danger. On 25 February when a company walked into an unmarked minefield near the village of Lac Son, the resulting explosions killed three Americans and wounded 12 others. The latest intelligence suggested that the headquarters and two companies from the 48th Battalion, some 200 men, had congregated in the hamlet of My Lai (4) and it was also home to some 400 civilians thought to be VC sympathizers. On the morning of 16 March the 1st Battalion, 20th Infantry was landed by helicopters at the edge of My Lai (4) and Company B, 4th Battalion, 3rd Infantry was landed near Mỹ Khê and they then perpetrated the My Lai Massacre.

On 23 April, a VC force led by the 95th Local Force Sapper Company and supported by elements of the 48th Local Force Battalion attacked a hamlet that was occupied by Marine Combined Action Program Team 135. Americal soldiers came to the aid of the defenders and with their help killed some 49 VC. The VC carried away most of the bodies as they withdrew. According to local villagers, one of the dead had been a battalion commander.

== Aftermath ==
On 10 June the operation was terminated.
