= Ronald Ridenhour =

American whistleblower and investigative journalist (1946–1998)

Ronald Lee "Ron" Ridenhour
- Ridenhour in 1969
- Born: April 6, 1946; Oakland, California, U.S.
- Died: May 10, 1998 (aged 52); Metairie, Louisiana, U.S.
- Education: Phoenix Junior College; Claremont Men's College
- Occupation: investigative journalist
- Known for: Exposing the My Lai massacre

External image
- Ron Ridenhour's press card. Displayed at The Ridenhour Prizes: About Ron.

Ronald Lee Ridenhour (April 6, 1946 – May 10, 1998) was an American whistleblower and investigative journalist known for having played a central role in spurring the federal investigation of the 1968 My Lai massacre in Vietnam. When he first learned of events there, he was serving in the United States 11th Infantry Brigade in Vietnam. He gathered evidence and interviewed people before the end of his tour. After returning to the US in 1969, he wrote to President Nixon, members of his cabinet and two dozen members of Congress recounting what he had learned. A full-scale Department of Defense investigation eventually took place.

Ridenhour became an investigative journalist, working on a range of topics. The Ridenhour Prizes were established in his honor.

== Life ==
Ridenhour was born in Oakland, California, and was raised in Phoenix, Arizona. He entered the U.S. Army during the Vietnam War, serving as a helicopter gunner.

While serving in Vietnam, Ridenhour heard of the My Lai massacre from friends in the service. While still on active duty, he gathered eyewitness and participant accounts from other soldiers.

After his return to the United States in 1969, he wrote a letter detailing the evidence he had uncovered, which he sent to President Richard Nixon, five senior officials at the State Department and the Pentagon, and 24 members of Congress.

The Department of Defense conducted a lengthy investigation. A total of 26 soldiers were charged with criminal offenses, although Second Lieutenant William Calley was the only one convicted, for killing 22 villagers. Despite being sentenced to life imprisonment, Calley spent less than three days in prison before being placed under house arrest by order of President Nixon, and after having his sentence reduced by the Army he was released after serving just three years.

== Postwar life ==
Ridenhour went to college after his service and graduated in 1972 from Claremont Men's College. He became an investigative journalist, reporting on a range of government scandals and other issues.

Years later, Ridenhour published an account of learning about the My Lai massacre in his article, "Jesus Was a Gook," published in Nobody Gets Off the Bus: The Viet Nam Generation Big Book (1994).

He died at age 52 of a heart attack in 1998 in Metairie, Louisiana. He had been playing handball.

== Honors ==
- In 1987 he won a George Polk Award for his expose of a tax scandal in New Orleans, based on a year-long investigation.
- In 1988 he earned the Gerald Loeb Award for Commentary.
- The Ridenhour Prizes were established in his honor. They "recognize those who persevere in acts of truth-telling that protect the public interest, promote social justice or illuminate a more just vision of society".

== Films ==
- 2025 - Cover-Up

== Debunked allegations about being in an experiment ==
According to Jonathan Glover's book, Humanity: A Moral History of the Twentieth Century (2001), Ridenhour took part in the Princeton University version of the Milgram experiment. This claim was investigated and it was found that the Ron Ridenhour who took part in the Milgram experiment was a different person than Ronald Lee Ridenhour.
