= Ernest Medina =

U.S. Army captain during the Vietnam War; partly responsible for the 1968 My Lai massacre

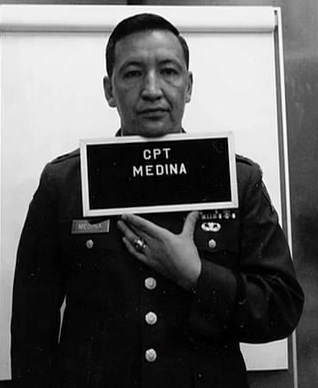
- Medina's mugshot
- Born: Ernest Lou Medina; August 27, 1936; Springer, New Mexico, U.S.
- Died: May 8, 2018 (aged 81); Marinette, Wisconsin, U.S.
- Military career
- Allegiance: United States
- Branch: United States Army
- Service years: 1952-1956 (National Guard); 1956–1971
- Rank: Captain
- Units: 1st Battalion, 20th Infantry, 11th Infantry Brigade, Americal Division
- Commands: Company C, 1/20 Americal
- Conflicts: Vietnam War: My Lai massacre
- Awards: Silver Star; Bronze Star Medal; Commendation Medal
- Other work: Real estate businessman

Ernest Lou Medina (August 27, 1936 – May 8, 2018) was a captain of infantry in the United States Army. He served during the Vietnam War. He was the commanding officer of Company C, 1st Battalion, 20th Infantry of the 11th Brigade, Americal Division, the unit responsible for the My Lai massacre of 16 March 1968. He was court-martialed in 1971 for his role in that massacre, but acquitted the same year.

Despite his exoneration in court, the negative publicity surrounding Medina led him to resign from the U.S. Army soon after his acquittal, and he never worked in public service again. He later admitted to having "not been completely candid" at his court-martial, claiming it was done to protect his reputation and that of the Army. Medina ultimately worked at his family's real estate business for the rest of his career, never speaking publicly about the My Lai massacre. He died in 2018 at the age of 81.

== Background ==
Ernest Medina was born on August 27, 1936, into a Mexican-American family in Springer, New Mexico. In 1952, at age 16, Medina lied about his age to enlist in the Colorado Army National Guard. After a variety of post–high school odd jobs, Medina joined the Regular Army in 1956. He served 12 years in the enlisted ranks (including his time in the National Guard) before being commissioned through Officer Candidate School in 1964.

Awarded both the Silver Star and Bronze Star Medal, Medina was promoted to captain in 1966 and was given command of Charlie Company in Hawaii, prior to its deployment to Vietnam.

== Court-martial ==
According to the 1970 investigation by General William R. Peers, Medina:

- "Planned, ordered, and supervised the execution by his company of an unlawful operation against inhabited hamlets in Son My village, which included the destruction of houses by burning, killing of livestock, and the destruction of crops and other foodstuffs, and the closing of wells; and impliedly directed the killing of any persons found there."
- "Possibly killed as many as three noncombatants in My Lai."

Because Article 4 of the Fourth Geneva Convention excluded South Vietnamese civilians (whose nation was a co-belligerent with the U.S.) from the status of protected persons in interstate wars, Medina could not be prosecuted for violations of international law related to protected persons. Instead, he was prosecuted under U.S. military law in 1971 and court-martialed under Article 77 of the Uniform Code of Military Justice (UCMJ) for willingly allowing his men to murder allied civilians at My Lai. Medina denied all the charges and claimed that he never gave any orders to kill Vietnamese noncombatants.

Medina's defense team, led by F. Lee Bailey, and a support staff that included Gary Myers, alleged that his men killed Vietnamese noncombatants under their own volition and not under Medina's orders. Medina also testified that he did not become aware that his troops were out of control at My Lai until the massacre was already well underway.

Medina also claimed to have only killed one Vietnamese noncombatant at My Lai, a young woman whom two soldiers testified that they found hiding in a ditch. When she emerged with her hands up, Medina shot her because, he claimed, he thought she had a grenade. In fact, she was unarmed. The defense lawyers brought up many wartime incidents of Viet Cong suspects and sympathizers faking surrender to use hidden pistols or grenades to harm or kill U.S. military personnel.

However, a helicopter crew in the area that day would have a different accounting of Medina's actions. A three-man crew consisting of WO1 Hugh Thompson, Crew Chief Spec 4 Glenn Andreotta and Gunner Lawrence Colburn witnessed the following at the Son My village. Per Lawrence Colburn: "Then we saw a young girl about twenty years old lying on the grass. We could see that she was unarmed and wounded in the chest. We marked her with smoke because we saw a squad not too far away. The smoke was green, meaning it's safe to approach. Red would have meant the opposite. We were hovering six feet off the ground not more than twenty feet away when Captain Medina came over, kicked her, stepped back, and finished her off. He did it right in front of us. When we saw Medina do that, it clicked. It was our guys doing the killing."

In August 1971, Medina was found not guilty of all charges. The jury deliberations lasted about 60 minutes.

Despite his acquittal, Medina's reputation was ruined by the court martial and the ensuing negative publicity. Realizing it was untenable for him to stay in the Army, he resigned his commission and left the Army shortly afterward. He later admitted that, during his court martial, he had "not been completely candid to avoid disgracing the military, the United States, his family, and himself."

== After the military ==
After resigning from the Army, Medina went to work at an Enstrom Helicopter Corporation plant owned by F. Lee Bailey in Menominee, Michigan. Medina moved with his family to Marinette, Wisconsin. He worked in his family's real estate business: Medina, Inc. Realtor in Marinette, Wisconsin. He died on May 8, 2018, at the age of 81.

== Cultural references ==
The Vietnam War Song Project has identified two songs referencing Medina. Medina is mentioned in the first stanza of Pete Seeger's Vietnam protest song "Last Train to Nuremberg" (1970), which also referenced Samuel W. Koster, William Calley, and Richard Nixon:

Do I see Lieutenant Calley? Do I see Captain Medina? Do I see Gen'ral Koster and all his crew?

Medina is also referenced in the calypso song "The My Lai Incident" (1970) by Trinidad & Tobago artist The Shah:

And a little boy that could be anybody's son was shot down by Medina / A platoon led by Lt. L. Calley.

== Decorations ==
The ribbon rack of Captain Medina:

Army Parachutists Badge
Combat Infantryman Badge
1st Row	Silver Star	Bronze Star Medal	Army Commendation Medal
2nd Row	Army Good Conduct Medal with award clasp	Army of Occupation Medal	National Defense Service Medal
3rd Row	Armed Forces Expeditionary Medal	Vietnam Service Medal with four 3/16 inch service stars	Vietnam Campaign Medal

== See also ==
- Medina standard
