= The Battle Hymn of Lt. Calley =

1971 single by Terry Nelson

Single by C-Company featuring Terry Nelson

from the album Wake Up America
- B-side: "Routine Patrol"
- Released: March 1971
- Recorded: 1971
- Studio: FAME Studios, Muscle Shoals, Alabama
- Genre: Spoken word
- Length: 3:27
- Label: Plantation
- Songwriters: Julian Wilson; James M. Smith
- Producer: James M. Smith

"The Battle Hymn of Lt. Calley" is a 1971 spoken word recording with vocals by Terry Nelson and music by pick-up group C-Company.

== Inspiration and meaning ==
The song is set to the tune of "The Battle Hymn of the Republic". It offers a heroic description of Lieutenant William Calley, who in March 1971 was convicted of murdering Vietnamese civilians in the Mỹ Lai massacre of March 16, 1968. The song discusses different opinions of the Vietnam War. It starts with Calley's childhood and how being a part of the war and fighting for your country was an aspiration for young children. It later discusses how at the time many Americans believed the killings in the war were wrong: "They've made me out a villain". Then the song talks about how in Vietnam soldiers were being killed and ambushed. Finally, it ends by saying that Calley was not to blame; he was only following orders and he thought it was an honor to fight at first, but there was no purpose or reward in doing so. The Vietnam War Song Project has identified over 100 songs about Lt. Calley and the Mỹ Lai massacre, with music historian Justin Brummer writing in History Today that "The most well-known song defending Calley was the ‘Battle Hymn of Lt. Calley’ (1971), by Terry Nelson, which sold over one million copies".

== Lyrical account ==
The song begins with an idealized, fictional account of Calley's childhood. Nelson then speaks as Calley, describing himself as a persecuted and forgotten soldier resentful of anti-war protesters and politicians who gave away battlefield victories at the negotiating table. "Calley" then gives a false account of the sustained and deliberate massacre of noncombatants at My Lai as an incident of battlefield collateral damage caused by non-uniformed enemy firing from amidst civilians.

== Background and success ==
| Chart (1971) | Peak position |
|---|---|
| U.S. Billboard Hot 100 | 37 |
| U.S. Billboard Hot Country Singles | 49 |

The song was written in April 1970 by Julian Wilson and James M. Smith of Muscle Shoals, Alabama. In November 1970 a few copies of it were issued by Quickit Publishing. In March 1971 Shelby Singleton, publisher of "Harper Valley PTA", obtained the rights to the song and issued a new recording under his Plantation Records label. The single sold over one million copies in just four days, and was certified gold by the RIAA on 15 April 1971. It went on to sell nearly two million copies, and got "a lot of C&W airplay".

== References in pop culture ==
- The song is mentioned in Hunter S. Thompson's 1971 novel Fear and Loathing in Las Vegas in a section where Raoul Duke believes he hears the song playing over the radio, much to his dismay, while expressing gratitude that his attorney Dr. Gonzo cannot seem to hear it, remarking it would "drive him into a racist frenzy".
- The song is discussed in the 2025 documentary Cover-Up.
