= William Calley =

US Army officer convicted for massacre at My Lai, Vietnam (1943–2024)

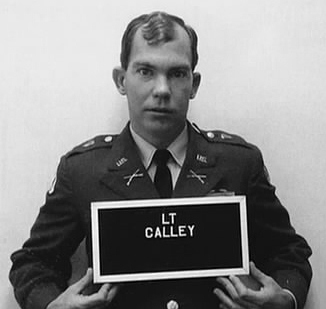
- Calley after his arrest, 1969
- Born: William Laws Calley Jr. June 8, 1943; Miami, Florida, U.S.
- Died: April 28, 2024 (aged 80); Gainesville, Florida, U.S.
- Convictions: Premeditated murder (22 counts); Assault with intent to commit murder
- Penalty: Life imprisonment with hard labor, forfeiture of all pay and allowances, and Dismissal from the armed forces: Commuted to 20 years imprisonment; Commuted to 10 years imprisonment; Commuted to three years of house arrest by President Richard Nixon
- Military career
- Allegiance: United States
- Branch: United States Army
- Service years: 1966–1971
- Rank: First lieutenant
- Units: 1st Platoon, Company C, 1st Battalion, 20th Infantry Regiment, 11th Infantry Brigade, 23rd Infantry Division (Americal)
- Conflicts: Vietnam War; My Lai massacre

William Laws Calley Jr. (June 8, 1943 – April 28, 2024) was an American war criminal. As a United States Army officer, he was convicted by court-martial of the murder of 22 unarmed South Vietnamese civilians in the My Lai massacre on March 16, 1968, during the Vietnam War. Calley was released to house arrest under orders by President Richard Nixon three days after his conviction. The United States District Court for the Middle District of Georgia granted him a new trial, but that ruling was overturned by the United States Court of Appeals for the Fifth Circuit. His initial life sentence having been modified to a term of 20 years and then further reduced to ten, Calley ultimately served three years of house arrest for the murders. Public opinion at the time about Calley was divided. After his dismissal from the U.S. Army and release from confinement, Calley avoided public attention.

Calley died on April 28, 2024, at the age of 80. His death went publicly unnoticed for three months until it was discovered in public records.

== Early life and education ==
Calley was born on June 8, 1943, in Miami, Florida. His father, William Laws Calley Sr., was a United States Navy veteran of World War II. Calley Jr. graduated from Miami Edison High School in Miami and then attended Palm Beach Junior College in 1963. He dropped out in 1964, having failed a majority of his classes.

Calley then had a variety of jobs before his U.S. Army career, including as a bellhop, dishwasher, salesman, insurance appraiser, and train conductor.

== Career ==
Calley enlisted in the U.S. Army on July 26, 1966, and underwent eight weeks of basic combat training at Fort Bliss, Texas, followed by eight weeks of advanced individual training as a company clerk at Fort Lewis, Washington. Having scored high enough on his Armed Forces Qualification tests, he applied for and was accepted into Officer Candidate School (OCS).

He then began 26 weeks of junior officer training at Fort Benning in mid-March 1967. Upon graduating from OCS Class No. 51 on September 7, 1967, he was commissioned a second lieutenant in the infantry. He was assigned to 1st Platoon, Company C, 1st Battalion, 20th Infantry Regiment, 11th Infantry Brigade, 23rd Infantry Division "The Americal Division", and began training at Schofield Barracks, Hawaii, in preparation for deployment to South Vietnam.

Calley's officer evaluations described his performance as average. Later, as the My Lai investigation progressed, a more negative picture emerged. Men in his platoon reported to Army investigators that Calley lacked common sense and could not read a map or use a compass properly.

In May or June 1969 near Chu Lai Base Area, Calley and two other Americal Division lieutenants were involved in a physical confrontation with five enlisted members of the United States Marine Corps. The fight ended after one of the Army officers pulled his pistol and fired a round into the air; the two other officers were briefly hospitalized, while Calley was "merely beaten up." The Marines pleaded guilty at special courts-martial, where they said they had not known that they were fighting officers.

=== My Lai massacre ===
On March 16, 1968, Calley led around 100 soldiers of Charlie company into the village of My Lai. Although they faced no resistance, they entered the village shooting. Using automatic weapons, grenades and bayonets, they murdered hundreds of civilians consisting mostly of South Vietnamese elderly men, women, children, and infants. Infants and children were killed with bayonets, and females were raped and shot.

The official American estimate of those murdered was 347, but a Vietnamese memorial at the site lists 504 names, with ages ranging from 1 to 82. In the My Lai museum in Vietnam, a marble plaque lists the names and ages of the victims. Included in the 504 were 60 elderly men and 282 women, 17 of whom were pregnant. A total of 173 children were killed; 53 were infants.

=== Murder trial ===
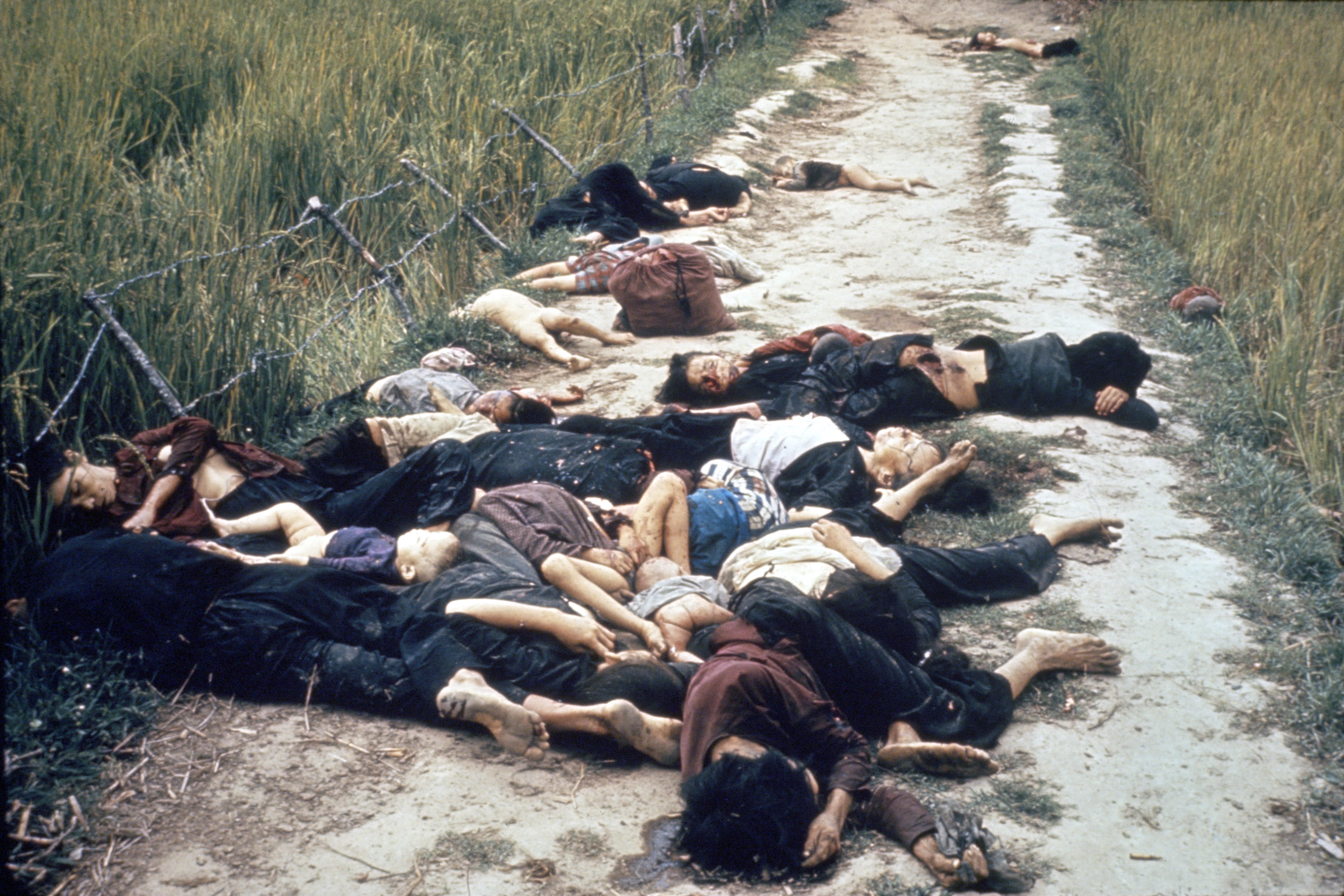
Photo taken by the Army photographer Ronald L. Haeberle on March 16, 1968, during the My Lai massacre, showing mostly women and children dead on a road

The events in My Lai were initially covered up by the U.S. Army. In April 1969, nearly 13 months after the massacre, Ronald Ridenhour, a GI who had been with the 11th Brigade, wrote letters to the President, Chairman of the Joint Chiefs of Staff, the Secretary of Defense and 30 members of Congress. In these letters, Ridenhour described some of the atrocities committed by the soldiers at My Lai that he had been told about.

Due to Article 4 of the Fourth Geneva Convention excluding allied civilians from the status of protected persons in an international armed conflict, Calley and his fellow soldiers could not be legally tried as war criminals. Calley was instead charged on September 5, 1969, with six specifications of premeditated murder under Article 118 of the Uniform Code of Military Justice (UCMJ) for the deaths of 109 South Vietnamese civilians near the village of Son My, at a hamlet called My Lai. On November 12, 1969, investigative reporters Seymour Hersh and Wayne Greenhaw broke the story and revealed that Calley had been charged with murdering 109 people.

Calley's trial started on November 17, 1970. It was the military prosecution's contention that Calley, in defiance of the rules of engagement, ordered his men to deliberately murder unarmed Vietnamese civilians, even though his men were not under enemy fire. Testimony revealed that Calley had ordered the men of 1st Platoon to kill everyone in the village.

In presenting the case, the two military prosecutors, Aubrey M. Daniel III and John Partin, were hamstrung by the reluctance of many soldiers to testify against Calley. Some soldiers refused to answer questions on the witness stand by citing their Fifth Amendment right against self-incrimination.

One holdout, Private First Class Paul David Meadlo, having been granted immunity, was ordered by Judge Reid W. Kennedy to testify or face contempt of court charges. Meadlo took the stand and recounted that as he stood guard over some 30 villagers whom he, along with Private Dennis Conti, had gathered at a defoliated area at the hamlet's southern tip, he was approached by Calley and told, regarding the civilians, "You know what to do with 'em." Meadlo took that as orders to only keep watch over them. Calley, however, returned ten minutes later and became enraged by the fact that the villagers were still alive. After telling Meadlo that he had wanted them dead, Calley backed up about 20 feet, opened fire on them himself and ordered Meadlo to join in, which he did. Meadlo then proceeded to round up more villagers to be killed.

Conti's testimony corroborated that given by Meadlo, and laid the blame on Calley not only for the initiation of the massacre but also for the participation in it by his subordinates. Another witness, Leonard Gonzalez, told of finding seven women, all naked, all dead, killed by several M-79 grenade launcher rounds.

Calley's original defense, that the death of the villagers was the result of an accidental airstrike, was overcome by prosecution witnesses. In his new defense, Calley claimed he was following the orders of his immediate superior, Captain Ernest Medina. Whether this order was actually given is disputed; Medina was acquitted of all charges relating to the incident at a separate trial in August 1971.

Taking the witness stand, Calley, under the direct examination by his civilian defense lawyer George W. Latimer, claimed that on the previous day, Medina made it clear that his unit was to move into the village and that everyone was to be shot, saying that they all were Viet Cong. Medina publicly denied that he had ever given such orders and stated that he had meant enemy soldiers, while Calley assumed that his order to "kill the enemy" meant to kill everyone. On direct examination during his court martial, Calley stated:

Well, I was ordered to go in there and destroy the enemy. That was my job on that day. That was the mission I was given. I did not sit down and think in terms of men, women, and children. They were all classified the same, and that was the classification that we dealt with, just as enemy soldiers ... I felt then and I still do that I acted as I was directed, and I carried out the orders that I was given, and I do not feel wrong in doing so, sir.

Calley expressed no remorse. Latimer also used Calley's low intelligence and poor performance in training as a defense, arguing that Calley was incompetent, should not have been made an infantry officer, and had been commissioned only because of manpower shortages.

The prosecution called over 100 witnesses to testify against Calley during the trial. After President Nixon intervened in the trial, the assistant prosecutor, Captain Partin, wrote a letter to the White House saying that the presidential intervention had "degraded" and "defiled" the military justice system.

After deliberating for 79 hours, the six-officer jury (five of whom had served in Vietnam) convicted Calley on March 29, 1971, of the premeditated murder of 22 South Vietnamese civilians, and assault with intent to murder a child of 2 years old. On March 31, 1971, Calley was sentenced to dismissal from the armed forces, forfeiture of all pay and allowances, and life imprisonment with hard labor at Fort Leavenworth, which includes the United States Disciplinary Barracks, the Department of Defense's only maximum security prison. Calley was the only one convicted out of the 26 officers and soldiers initially charged for their part in the My Lai massacre or the subsequent cover-up. Many observers saw My Lai as a direct result of the military's attrition strategy with its emphasis on body counts and kill ratios.

Many in the United States were outraged by what they perceived to be an overly harsh sentence for Calley. Georgia's Governor, Jimmy Carter, future President of the United States, instituted American Fighting Man's Day, and asked Georgians to drive for a week with their lights on. Indiana's Governor Edgar Whitcomb asked that all state flags be flown at half-staff for Calley, and the governors of Utah and Mississippi also publicly disagreed with the verdict. The legislatures of Arkansas, Kansas, Texas, New Jersey, and South Carolina requested clemency for Calley. Alabama's governor, George Wallace, visited Calley in the stockade and requested that President Richard Nixon pardon him. After the conviction, the White House received over 5,000 telegrams; the ratio was 100 to 1 in favor of leniency. In a telephone survey of the U.S. public, 79 percent disagreed with the verdict, 81 percent believed that the life sentence Calley had received was too stern, and 69 percent believed Calley had been made a scapegoat.

Nixon received so many telegrams from Americans requesting clemency or a pardon for Calley that he remarked to Henry Kissinger, "Most people don't give a shit whether he killed them or not."

In a recollection on the Vietnam War, South Korea's Vietnam Expeditionary Forces commander Chae Myung-shin stated that "Calley tried to get revenge for the deaths of his troops. In a war, this is natural." Conversely, U.S. Army Colonel Harry G. Summers Jr. declared that Calley and Medina should have been hanged, drawn, and quartered, with their remains placed "at the gates of Fort Benning, at the Infantry School, as a reminder to those who pass under it of what an infantry officer ought to be."

=== Appeals ===
Three days after Calley's conviction, Nixon ordered Calley removed from prison and placed under house arrest at Fort Benning. On August 20, 1971, Lt. Gen. Albert O. Connor, Commanding General of Third Army, in his capacity as the convening authority, reduced Calley's sentence to 20 years in prison. As required by law, his conviction and sentence were reviewed by the United States Army Court of Criminal Appeals, and the United States Court of Appeals for the Armed Forces, both of which sustained the verdict and sentence.

Calley appealed his conviction to the United States District Court for the Middle District of Georgia. On February 27, 1974, Judge J. Robert Elliott granted a writ of habeas corpus and set Calley free on bail. The court held that Calley had been improperly convicted due to extensive pre-trial publicity, the military court's refusal to permit certain defense witnesses, the refusal of the United States House of Representatives to release testimony about the My Lai massacre taken in executive session, and inadequate notice of charges. As the Army appealed Judge Elliott's decision, Secretary of the Army Howard H. Callaway reviewed Calley's conviction and sentence as required by law. After reviewing the conclusions of the court-martial, Court of Military Review, and Court of Military Appeals, Callaway reduced Calley's sentence to just 10 years. Under military regulations, a prisoner is eligible for parole after serving one-third of his sentence. This made Calley eligible for parole after serving three years and four months.

A three-judge panel of the United States Court of Appeals for the Fifth Circuit reversed the district court's ruling and returned Calley to custody on June 13, 1974. Calley once more appealed his conviction to Judge Elliott. He asked the Circuit Justice of the Fifth Circuit, Lewis F. Powell Jr., to set him free on bail while his appeal was pending, but Powell denied the request.

The district court once more found the pre-trial publicity, the denial of defense witnesses, and improperly drawn charges had denied Calley a fair trial, and ordered him released on September 25, 1974. Calley was released on bail while the government appealed the ruling. The Fifth Circuit Court of Appeals heard the Army's latest appeal en banc. The full court ruled 8-to-5 to overturn the district court, and ordered Calley's conviction and sentence reinstated on September 10, 1975. Because Calley had less than 10 days to serve before his possible parole, and because Army Secretary Callaway had expressed his intention to parole Calley as soon as possible, the Army refused to incarcerate Calley for the remaining 10 days of his sentence.

Calley appealed the Fifth Circuit's ruling to the U.S. Supreme Court, but it declined to hear the case on April 5, 1976.

== After release ==
On May 15, 1976, Calley married Penny Vick, the daughter of a Columbus, Georgia, jewelry store owner. Judge Elliott attended the wedding. The couple had one son and divorced in 2005 or 2006. Calley worked at his father-in-law's store and became a gemologist and obtained his real estate license, which had initially been denied due to his criminal record. During his divorce proceedings, Calley stated that he had prostate cancer and gastrointestinal problems that gave him no chance of earning a living.

Calley's only known public apology for his role in the My Lai massacre was made 41 years after the event on August 19, 2009, while speaking to the Kiwanis Club of Greater Columbus:

There is not a day that goes by that I do not feel remorse for what happened that day in My Lai. I feel remorse for the Vietnamese who were killed, for their families, for the American soldiers involved and their families. I am very sorry. ... If you are asking why I did not stand up to them when I was given the orders, I will have to say that I was a 2nd lieutenant getting orders from my commander and I followed them—foolishly, I guess."

== Later life and death ==
As of 2018, Calley was living in Gainesville, Florida. He died there on April 28, 2024, at the age of 80. His death was not reported until July 29, when it was discovered in public records. On his death certificate, a question asking if he had ever served "in [the] U.S. Armed Forces" was marked down as: "No".

== Films ==
- 2025 – Cover-Up

== See also ==
- Glenn Andreotta, Lawrence Colburn, and Hugh Thompson Jr. – U.S. helicopter crew members who intervened to stop the My Lai killings
- Samuel W. Koster – Commanding officer of the Americal Division
- John W. Donaldson – Later Commander of the 11th Infantry Brigade who in 1971 was accused and acquitted of killing six Vietnamese civilians in 1968/9
- Terry Nelson – One-hit wonder who released "The Battle Hymn of Lt. Calley" (1971), a song about Calley
- Robert Bales – Former United States Army soldier who murdered 16 Afghan civilians and was sentenced to life in prison without parole
- Superior orders – The practice of pleading not guilty, by means of "following orders"
