= Lawrence Colburn =

US Army soldier (1949–2016)

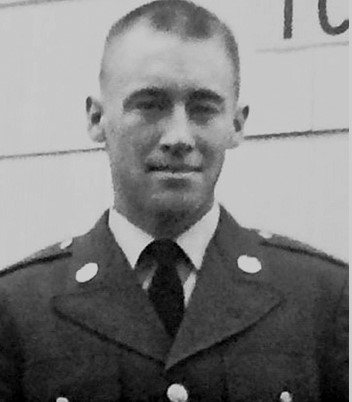
- Colburn in 1966
- Born: Lawrence Manley Colburn; July 6, 1949; Coulee Dam, Washington, U.S.
- Died: December 13, 2016 (aged 67); Canton, Georgia, U.S.
- Military career
- Branch: United States Army
- Service years: 1966–1970
- Rank: Specialist 4
- Conflicts: Vietnam War
- Awards: Bronze Star; Soldier's Medal

Lawrence Manley Colburn (July 6, 1949 – December 13, 2016) was a United States Army veteran who, while serving as a helicopter gunner in the Vietnam War, intervened in the March 16, 1968 Mỹ Lai massacre.

Born in Coulee Dam, Washington, Colburn grew up in Mount Vernon, with his father (a veteran contractor from World War II), mother, and three sisters, where he would serve as an altar boy for four years while attending Immaculate Conception Catholic School.

After dropping out of Mount Vernon High School, he joined the army at age 17 in 1966 and was assigned to train at Fort Lewis followed by a stint at Fort Polk. He was then sent to Fort Shafter in Hawaii, where he earned his GED before being sent to Vietnam in December 1967. In South Vietnam he was assigned to the 161st Assault Helicopter Company (later reorganized as the 123rd Aviation Battalion) with the rank of Specialist Four. Serving as a door-gunner on an OH-23 Raven observation helicopter, his crew chief was Specialist Four Glenn Andreotta and his pilot was Warrant Officer One Hugh Thompson Jr.

Thirty years after the fact all three men were decorated with the Soldier's Medal for their heroic actions at My Lai.

== My Lai Massacre ==
In the early morning hours of March 16, 1968, during Charlie Company, 1st Battalion, 20th Infantry Regiment, Americal Division's assault on a hamlet known on U.S. military maps as My Lai 4, Colburn's OH-23 helicopter surprisingly encountered no enemy fire while hovering over this suspected headquarters of the Viet Cong 48th battalion. Spotting two possible Viet Cong suspects, Thompson forced the Vietnamese men to surrender and flew them off to the rear for tactical interrogation. He also marked the location of several wounded Vietnamese with a green smoke marker, a signal that they needed help.

Returning to the My Lai area at around 09:00 after refueling, the crew noticed that the people they had marked were now dead. Out in a paddy field beside a dike 200 meters south of the hamlet, they marked the location of a wounded young Vietnamese woman. Thompson and his crew watched from a low hover as Captain Ernest Medina (Charlie Company's Commander) came up to the woman, prodded her with his foot, stepped back, and then shot and killed her. (At his court martial, Medina claimed that he had turned away from her and then, startled by the sound of sudden movement behind him, spun back around and shot her, thinking she had been hiding a weapon under herself.)

Thompson then flew over an irrigation ditch filled with dozens of bodies. Shocked at the sight, he radioed his accompanying gunships, knowing his transmission would be monitored by many on the net: "It looks to me like there's an awful lot of unnecessary killing going on down there. Something ain't right about this. There's bodies everywhere. There's a ditch full of bodies that we saw. There's something wrong here."

Movement from the ditch indicated to Thompson that there were still people alive in there. Thompson landed his helicopter and dismounted. David Mitchell, a sergeant and squad leader in 1st Platoon, Charlie Company, walked over to him. When asked by Thompson whether any help could be provided to the people in the ditch, the sergeant replied that the only way to help them was to put them out of their misery. Second Lieutenant William Calley (1st Platoon Leader, Charlie Company) then came up, and the two had the following conversation:

Thompson: What's going on here, Lieutenant?
Calley: This is my business.
Thompson: What is this? Who are these people?
Calley: Just following orders.
Thompson: Orders? Whose orders?
Calley: Just following...
Thompson: But, these are human beings, unarmed civilians, sir.
Calley: Look Thompson, this is my show. I'm in charge here. It ain't your concern.
Thompson: Yeah, great job.
Calley: You better get back in that chopper and mind your own business.
Thompson: You ain't heard the last of this!

Thompson took off again, and Andreotta reported that Mitchell was now executing the people in the ditch. Furious, Thompson flew over the northeast corner of the village and spotted a group of about ten civilians, including children, running toward a homemade bomb shelter. Pursuing them were soldiers from 2nd Platoon, Charlie Company. Realizing that the soldiers intended to murder the Vietnamese, Thompson landed his aircraft between them and the villagers. Thompson turned to Colburn and Andreotta and told them that if the Americans began shooting at the villagers or him, they should fire their M60 machine guns at the Americans: "Y'all cover me! If these bastards open up on me or these people, you open up on them. Promise me!" Colburn (whose M60 faced 2nd Platoon) replied, "You got it boss, consider it done." He turned his weapon to face the American soldiers and exchanged stares with them, but privately was uncertain if he could actually fire on his fellow countrymen. Thompson then dismounted to confront 2nd Platoon's leader, Lieutenant Stephen Brooks. Thompson told him he wanted help getting the peasants out of the bunker:

Thompson: Hey listen, hold your fire. I'm going to try to get these people out of this bunker. Just hold your men here.
Brooks: Yeah, we can help you get 'em out of that bunker – with a hand grenade!
Thompson: Just hold your men here. I think I can do better than that.

Brooks declined to argue with him, even though as a commissioned officer he outranked Thompson.

After coaxing the 11 Vietnamese out of the bunker, Thompson persuaded the pilots of the two UH-1 Huey gunships (Dan Millians and Brian Livingstone) flying as his escort to evacuate them. (Gunships would ordinarily never land in a combat zone.) While Thompson was returning to base to refuel, Andreotta spotted movement in an irrigation ditch filled with approximately 100 bodies. The helicopter again landed and the men dismounted to search for survivors. After wading through the remains of the dead and dying men, women and children, Andreotta extracted a live boy, Do Ba. Thompson flew the survivor to the ARVN hospital in Quảng Ngãi where he left the child under the care of a nun.

Upon finally returning to their base at about 11:00, Thompson heatedly reported the massacre to his superior officer, Colonel Oran Henderson. Thompson's allegations of civilian killings quickly reached Lieutenant Colonel Frank Barker, the operation's overall ground commander. Barker radioed his executive officer to find out from Captain Medina what was happening on the ground. Medina then gave the cease-fire order to Charlie Company to "knock off the killing".

== After the massacre ==
American commanders were initially successful in covering up the massacre. All of Thompson's crew received decorations for their actions at My Lai, with Colburn receiving the Bronze Star with Combat "V" device on May 14, 1968. An account of the action was fabricated for Colburn's document accompanying the decoration, and Thompson's signature was forged on the eyewitness report.

On December 20, 1969, Colburn testified to the investigative Peers Commission on what he had seen on March 16, 1968, in My Lai (4).

== Post-war ==
After the war, Colburn married and became the father of a son, Conner. He managed a ski repair business in Oregon, and owned and managed an Atlanta business that sells orthopedic rehabilitation equipment.

Exactly thirty years later, Colburn and Thompson were awarded the Soldier's Medal, the United States Army's highest award for bravery not involving direct contact with the enemy. At the same time, a posthumous medal was also awarded to Andreotta. "It was the ability to do the right thing even at the risk of their personal safety that guided these soldiers to do what they did," then-Major General Michael Ackerman said at the 1998 ceremony. The three "set the standard for all soldiers to follow." Additionally on March 10, 1998, Senator Max Cleland (D-GA) entered a tribute to Thompson, Colburn and Andreotta into the record of the U.S. Senate. Cleland said the three men were, "true examples of American patriotism at its finest."

Also in 1998, Thompson and Colburn returned to the village of My Lai, where they met some of the villagers they rescued, including Thi Nhung and Pham Thi Nhanh, two women who had been part of the group that was about to be killed by Brooks' 2nd Platoon. They also dedicated a new elementary school for the children of the village.

Both Colburn and Thompson were awarded the Peace Abbey "Courage of Conscience Award" on July 4, 1999.

During the 2001 invasion of Afghanistan, Colburn expressed a "bad feeling" about the invasion that he felt may have touched off a much larger war than was intended. He was at Hugh Thompson's bedside when the latter died of cancer on January 6, 2006.

In 2003, at a Moral Lecture Series address to midshipmen at the United States Naval Academy, Colburn made the following remarks:

Combat is chaotic. Combat is primal. And something surfaces in you, especially when you see people close to you fall. And it's very difficult to control. Your job as young officers is to monitor those men who are pulling the trigger to make sure that that primal instinct, you have to keep it in check somehow.

For the dedication of the peace park of the massacre (March 16, 2001), Colburn was reunited with Do Ba, the young child Andreotta had rescued from the ditch. "I'm very glad to see the man who rescued me," Ba said, as the two men lit incense at the graves of Ba's mother, sister and brother, who were 31, four and two when they were killed. "He's a good man... But I still feel hatred for the soldiers who killed my mother, my brother and my sister." Colburn also appeared in a PBS American Experience special on the incident, which aired April 26, 2010.

On July 4, 1999, Colburn and Hugh Thompson co-chaired the Stonewalk Project which organized and led the physical pulling of the one ton granite, memorial stone for Unknown Civilians Killed in War from Sherborn, Massachusetts to Arlington National Cemetery. In March 2012, the Dover-Sherborn Press in Massachusetts published a column by Colburn commenting on the comparisons between the recent civilian massacre in Panjwai, Afghanistan and the My Lai massacre.

Colburn died on December 13, 2016, from cancer at the age of 67.
