= American Division =

American Division may refer to:

- American Division (NHL), a former division of the National Hockey League
- South Division (CFL), a former American-only division of the Canadian Football League

== See also ==
- For information on United States military divisions, see United States Army
