= Sơn Mỹ =

- Commune
- Interactive map of Sơn Mỹ
- Coordinates: 10.659625994165646°N 107.69146267757972°E
- Country: Vietnam
- Region: South Central Coast and Central Highlands
- Province: Lâm Đồng
- Established: 1979

Area
  - Total: 254.52 km^{2} (98.27 sq mi)

Population (31 December 2024)
  - Total: 26,599
  - Density: 104/km^{2} (270/sq mi)

Sơn Mỹ is a commune in Lâm Đồng province, Vietnam.

On 16 June 2025, the Standing Committee of the National Assembly of Vietnam issued Resolution No. 1671/NQ-UBTVQH15 on the arrangement of commune-level administrative units in Lâm Đồng province in 2025, effective from the same date. Under the resolution, the entire area and population of Sơn Mỹ, Tân Thắng, and Thắng Hải communes, formerly part of Hàm Tân district, were merged to form a new commune named Sơn Mỹ (Clause 66, Article 1).
