= Samuel W. Koster =

US Army general (1919–2006)

Samuel William Koster
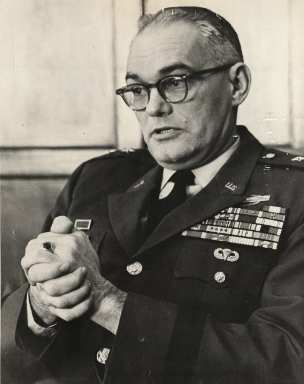
- Koster circa 1970. His uniform includes the ribbon for the Army Distinguished Service Medal, which was subsequently rescinded.
- Born: December 29, 1919; West Liberty, Iowa, U.S.
- Died: January 23, 2006 (aged 86); Annapolis, Maryland, U.S.
- Burial place: West Point Cemetery
- Spouse: Cherie Kadgihn (m. 1943)
- Children: 5
- Military career
- Allegiance: United States of America
- Branch: United States Army
- Service years: 1942–1973
- Rank: Major general (highest rank held); Brigadier general (rank at retirement)
- Unit: U.S. Army Infantry Branch
- Commands: Superintendent, United States Military Academy; Americal Division; Task Force Oregon; Plans and Programs Division, Office of the U.S. Army Assistant Chief of Staff for Force Development; Command and Staff Department, United States Army Infantry School; 1st Infantry Brigade; 29th Infantry Battle Group
- Conflicts: World War II; Korean War; Vietnam War
- Awards: Army Distinguished Service Medal (later rescinded); Silver Star (2); Legion of Merit (3); Bronze Star Medal (2); Air Medal (5); Purple Heart
- Other work: Executive vice president, Koppers and Hanson Industries

Samuel William Koster (December 29, 1919 – January 23, 2006) was a career officer in the United States Army. Hailing from rural Iowa, he graduated West Point in 1942 after the attack on Pearl Harbor and attained the rank of major general. Koster is known for his service as commander of the 23rd Infantry Division during the infamous My Lai Massacre in 1968 after the Tet Offensive, later becoming the Superintendent of the US Military Academy at West Point.

A veteran of World War II, the Korean War, and the Vietnam War, Koster served in the U.S. Army for a total of 29 years. Although the criminal charges initially filed against him after the My Lai massacre were dropped, Koster's involvement would eventually cost him two stars. His expected promotion to lieutenant general, the traditional modern-day rank of the Superintendent of West Point, was denied, and he received a reduction in rank to brigadier general, while the Army Distinguished Service Medal that he received was rescinded.

Koster retired in 1973, two years after William Calley and Ernest Medina faced their respective trials by court-martial. Koster lived out his retirement years in Maryland, never speaking publicly about the events at My Lai, expressing no shame or remorse for the murders carried out by the men under his command, nor for any actions he had taken. He died in 2006, aged 87, and was buried at West Point Cemetery.

== Early life and career ==
Koster was born in West Liberty, Iowa, on December 29, 1919, and graduated from West Liberty High School in 1937. He graduated from the United States Military Academy in 1942, and was commissioned as a second lieutenant of Infantry.

After completing his Infantry Officer Basic Course, Koster was assigned to the 413th Infantry Regiment, a unit of the 104th Infantry Division. After completing organization and training at Camp Adair, Oregon, the 413th served in Europe until the end of World War II. Koster took part in four campaigns, and advanced through the positions of platoon leader, company commander, regimental staff officer, battalion executive officer, battalion commander, and regimental executive officer. During the war he also completed his Infantry Officer Advanced Course and graduated from the United States Army Command and General Staff College at Fort Leavenworth, Kansas .

== Post-World War II ==
After the war Koster served with the 20th and 2d Armored Divisions at Fort Hood, Texas, including assignments as a battalion commander and division staff officer. He then served in the Intelligence staff section (G-2) at the Far East Command headquarters in Japan. After returning to the United States in 1949, he was assigned as a tactical officer at West Point. During the Korean War Koster returned to Asia, serving with both Operations and Training (G-3) and G-2 staff sections of the Far East Command and the Eighth United States Army. He was then assigned to direct Eighth Army's United Nations Partisan Infantry Korea operations against North Korea.

== Post-Korean War ==
After the war Koster completed the Armed Forces Staff College. He was subsequently posted to the Office of the U.S. Army G-3, where he served for three years in the Operations Directorate. In July, 1956 Koster was assigned to Supreme Headquarters Allied Powers Europe (SHAPE) in Paris, where he served as deputy secretary and then secretary of the staff. In 1959 he returned to the United States and began attendance at the National War College, from which he graduated in 1960. In the early 1960s Koster was assigned to Fort Benning, Georgia, where he served as commander of the 29th Infantry Battle Group, followed by command of the 1st Infantry Brigade.

He then served as director of the Infantry Center and School's Command and Staff Department, followed by assignment as chief of staff of the Infantry Center and School. Koster was assigned to Eighth United States Army in South Korea in 1964, serving as deputy assistant G-3 and assistant G-3. In April 1966, he was assigned as director of the Plans and Programs Division in the Office of the Army's Assistant Chief of Staff for Force Development. By 1967 he had attained the rank of Major General, and at the height of the Vietnam War was assigned to command Task Force Oregon. The task force was later reorganized as the reactivated 23rd Infantry (Americal) Division.

== My Lai massacre ==
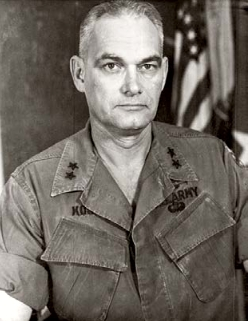
Gen. Koster, circa 1968

On March 16, 1968, a company of Americal Division troops led by Captain Ernest Medina and Lieutenant William Calley slaughtered hundreds of civilians in a South Vietnamese hamlet known as My Lai (referred to as "Pinkville" by the troops). While no official count was made, soldiers and investigators later estimated that 350 to 500 women, children and old men were killed with grenades, rifles, bayonets, and machine guns; some were burned to death in their huts. Corpses were piled in ditches that became mass graves. No Viet Cong were ever discovered in the village and no shots were fired in opposition. To many Americans at home, the massacre marked the moral nadir of the war in Southeast Asia and became a pivotal event in the conflict.

Koster was not on the ground at My Lai, but he did fly over the village in a helicopter while the soldiers moved in, and afterward. He later testified that he believed only about 20 civilians had died, although he also said that he was told about "wild shooting" and about a confrontation between ground troops and a helicopter pilot (later identified as Hugh Thompson Jr.) who tried to stop the killing of civilians. Koster later ordered subordinates to file reports on the incident, but they were incomplete, and one was even lost. To make matters worse, these reports were never sent to headquarters, as military protocol required, until an Americal veteran named Ron Ridenhour triggered a secret high-level investigation by sending a three-page letter detailing the evidence he had uncovered about the massacre to the Pentagon, the president, and members of Congress in March 1969.

Early in 1970, Koster and 13 other officers were charged with trying to cover up the massacre. Charges were dropped, however, after the Army determined that he "did not show any intentional abrogation of responsibilities". Koster, who was the Superintendent of the United States Military Academy at West Point at the time, was due to be promoted to the rank of lieutenant general (three stars), but his involvement in the My Lai cover up caused him to be denied this promotion, and further inquiries led the way to his demotion. He was subsequently censured in writing, stripped of a Distinguished Service Medal and demoted to brigadier general for failing to conduct an adequate investigation. Koster's appeal was turned down.

== Later life ==
Following his demotion, Koster was reassigned as deputy commander of Maryland's Aberdeen Proving Ground, in charge of Army weapons testing. He retired from the military in November 1973 with the rank of brigadier general. His decorations included the Silver Star, Bronze Star Medal, and Legion of Merit. After his retirement, Koster worked for 12 years as an executive vice president for the power transmission division of Koppers and Hanson Industries in Baltimore. In this role, Koster was responsible for the oversight of electricity plants in the United States and Canada. In 33 years of retired life, Koster never spoke publicly about the My Lai massacre, and never indicated any shame or regret for his attempts at covering it up. He lived out the rest of his days in Maryland.

== Personal life ==
He died in Annapolis on January 23, 2006. He is buried at West Point Cemetery, Sec. 18, Row G, Grave 084B. Koster never regained the highest rank he had attained in the U.S. Army—major general—but it was engraved on his headstone regardless. In 1943, Koster married Cherie Kadgihn (1922–2018), who was originally from Iowa City, Iowa. They were the parents of five children—sons Samuel Jr., Robert, and Jack, all of whom became U.S. Army officers, and daughters Susanne Henley-Ross and Nancy Sroka.

== Cultural references ==
Koster is mentioned by name in the first stanza of Pete Seeger's Vietnam protest song "Last Train to Nuremberg".

"Do I see Lieutenant Calley? Do I see Captain Medina? Do I see Gen'ral Koster and all his crew?"

Military offices
Preceded by Donald V. Bennett	Superintendents of the United States Military Academy; 1969–1970	Succeeded by William A. Knowlton
