= Four Hours in My Lai =

- Directed by: Kevin Sim
- Country of origin: United Kingdom
- Original language: English

Production
- Producers: Kevin Sim & Michael Bilton

Original release
- Network: ITV
- Release: 2 May 1989

Four Hours in My Lai is a 1989 television documentary written and directed by Kevin Sim for Yorkshire Television concerning the 1968 My Lai Massacre by the U.S. Army during the Vietnam War. The film includes interviews with soldiers at the massacre, and the later trials of those involved. The programme first broadcast on ITV as part of Yorkshire Television's First Tuesday documentaries. Michael Bilton and Kevin Sim, who created the film, based a book of the same name off the documentary. The book, which is still in print in the United States and the UK, has also been translated and published in Japan. It remains on the reading list around the world of many college and university courses on the Vietnam War.

== Description ==
The documentary and book tell the story of the 11th Light Infantry Brigade, from their training through deployment in South Vietnam. It interviews former U.S. servicemen and massacre survivors; both describe the background of the area where the village of My Lai lay. (U.S soldiers referred to the entire area, made up of several hamlets and sub-hamlets, as "Pinkville". due to the reddish-pink colour used on military maps to denote more heavily populated areas.) The documentary also shows photographs of U.S. servicemen torturing civilians before the massacre and tells of U.S. servicemen raping South Vietnamese women and children prior to the massacre. After the massacre, the trials of the soldiers at My Lai are examined. The documentary is narrated by Mark Halliley. It also aired on the PBS series Frontline as Remember My Lai.

== Reception ==
In 1989, the film won an International Emmy Award for Best Documentary. Upon release, Bilton and Sim's book Four Hours in My Lai was met with mixed reception. In a review for Chicago Tribune, Marc Leepson criticised the book for avoiding "the common tactics of the Viet Cong", and describing their activities "in euphemistically positive terms." Leepson went on to say the book "paints a distorted picture of the Vietnam war". Writing for The Boston Globe, Gail Caldwell said the book was written with a "staccato, cinematographic style", and praised it for providing "broad context, from the horrific losses Charlie Company had endured [...] to the cover-up and subsequent acquittal of several chief Army officers". Murray Polner of Washington Monthly credited the two for "[laying]out the complete story, from the raid to the coverup, in straightforward and often agonizing detail."
