= 20th Infantry Regiment (United States) =

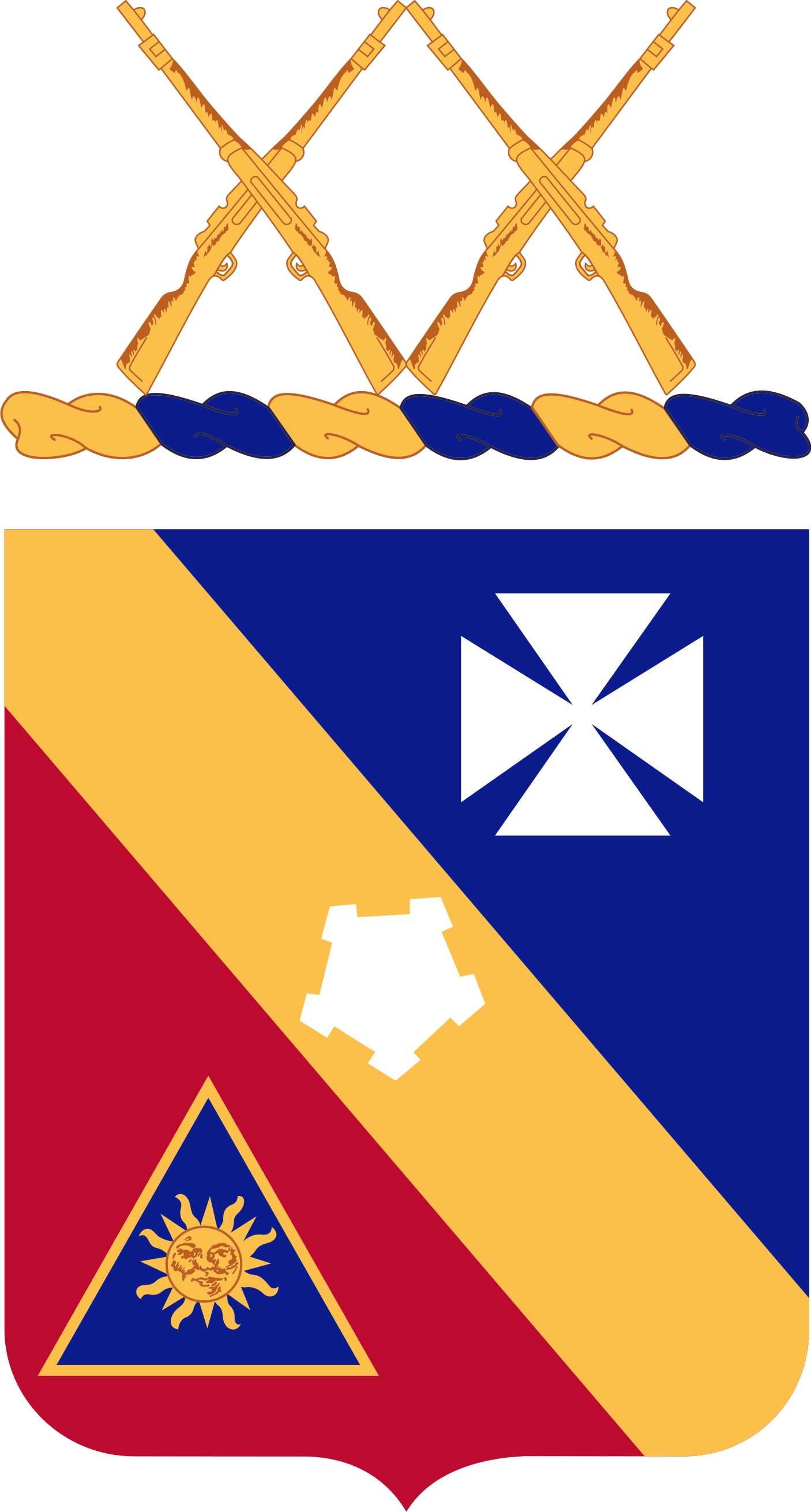
- Coat of arms
- Founded: 1862
- Country: United States
- Branch: United States Army
- Type: Infantry
- Role: Stryker infantry (5th BN)
- Nickname: "Sykes Regulars" (special designation)
- Motto: Tant Que Je Puis (To The Limit of Our Ability)
- Engagements: American Civil War; Indian Wars; Spanish-American War; Philippine–American War; World War II; Vietnam War; My Lai massacre; Global War on Terrorism; Iraq War; War in Afghanistan

Commanders
- Current commander: LTC Michael P Wallace (5th BN)
- Notable commanders: John W. Heavey; Clement A. Trott

Insignia
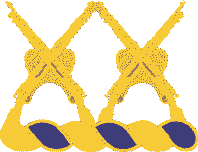
- Identification symbol

The 20th Infantry Regiment ("Sykes' Regulars") is a United States Army infantry regiment. Currently only the 5th Battalion of the 20th Infantry still exists. Stationed at Joint Base Lewis-McChord and part of the 1st Stryker Brigade Combat Team, 7th Infantry Division, 5-20 Infantry was one of the original battalions selected to take part in the testing and fielding of the U.S. Army's then-new Stryker vehicle.

== History ==
=== Creation ===
The regiment was organized on 6 June 1862 at Fort Independence (Massachusetts), as the 2nd Battalion of the 11th Infantry, one of the nine "three-battalion" regiments of regulars, each battalion containing eight companies of infantry, in contrast to the original ten regular regiments of infantry, which were organized on the traditional ten-company line. The 20th Infantry was first led by General George Sykes in the Battle of Bull Run.

Following the US Civil War, the Army was reorganized by Congress in July 1866, and the 11th was divided into three regiments, each battalion receiving two additional companies and being organized along traditional lines. The 1st Battalion retained the designation of the 11th Infantry, while the 2nd Battalion became the 20th Infantry and the 3rd Battalion the 29th Infantry.

In 1869 the Regiment was headquartered at Fort Snelling, Minnesota, with two companies at Fort Ripley.

=== Interwar period ===
The 20th Infantry was stationed at Fort Riley, Kansas, as of June 1919 as a separate regiment. It was transferred on 1 July 1919 to Fort Crook, Nebraska. Concurrently, the 1st Battalion was transferred to Fort Brady, Michigan, and the 2nd Battalion was transferred to Fort Benjamin Harrison, Indiana. The regiment was assigned to the newly constituted 4th Infantry Brigade, 2nd Division, on 18 September 1920. The entire regiment was transferred on 29 September 1920 to Fort Sam Houston, Texas with the 2nd Division. The 3rd Battalion was transferred in March 1925 to Fort Sill, Oklahoma. The entire regiment transferred with the 4th Infantry Brigade on 28 June 1927 to Fort D.A. Russell, Wyoming (later redesignated Fort Francis E. Warren). The regiment was deployed to Camp Stephen D. Little, Arizona, 13 April–18 May 1929, and patrolled the Mexican border in response to the Escobar–Topete Revolution. Company D was awarded the Edwin Howard Clark machine gun trophy for 1932. In April 1933 the regiment assumed command and control of the Wyoming Civilian Conservation Corps District. Assigned Reserve officers conducted summer training with the regiment at Fort Francis E. Warren. With the "triangularization" of the Regular Army's divisions beginning in 1939, the 20th Infantry was relieved from the 2nd Division on 16 October 1939 and assigned to the reactivated 6th Division. It was transferred 17 November 1939 to Fort Jackson, South Carolina, but returned to Fort Francis E. Warren on 28 May 1940. The regiment was then transferred to Fort Leonard Wood, Missouri, and arrived there 20 May 1941.

=== Cold War ===
4th Battalion, 20th Infantry served at Fort Clayton, Panama during the 1960s through the 80s. They were part of the 193rd Infantry Brigade. 5-20 Infantry, the 5th Battalion, 20th Infantry Regiment ("Sykes' Regulars") was redesignated on 16 August 1986 as Headquarters and Headquarters Company, 5th Battalion, 20th Infantry (Mechanized) assigned to the 1st Brigade, 2nd Infantry Division on Camp Casey, Korea. From 1986 to 1995 the 5th Battalion, 20th Infantry (Mechanized) were responsible for conducting patrol missions along the Korean DMZ during the Cold War. Once the Cold War ended the battalion was pulled off of their permanent position along the DMZ, and conducted stability and support operations (SASO) throughout South Korea. In 1995, the battalion was reassigned to Fort Lewis, and the 2nd Battalion, 9th Infantry replaced them at Camp Casey.

==== Vietnam War ====
The 1st Battalion deployed to South Vietnam from Hawaii as part of the 11th Infantry Brigade on 18 December 1967. The Battalion was organized as a light infantry formation. The Battalion served in the vicinity of Đức Phổ, Đông Hà, Chu Lai and The Loi.

A separate element of the Regiment, Company E, 20th Infantry was deployed from 25 September 1967 through 1 February 1969 to serve as the Long Range Patrol element for the I Field Force and the 4th Infantry Division. Company E's second tour was 30 June 1971 through 16 August 1972 as a rifle security company in support of the 71st Transportation Battalion and the logistics base at Long Binh.

===== My Lai massacre =====
In March 1968, Lieutenant William Calley's 1st Platoon, Company C, 1st Battalion, 20th Infantry (11th Infantry Brigade) slaughtered hundreds of South Vietnamese civilians in the My Lai Massacre. A helicopter crew from the division's 123rd Aviation Battalion, led by Hugh Thompson, Jr., attempted to intervene in the massacre and were later awarded the Soldier's Medal. Seymour Hersh broke the story of the massacre in November 1969, and a year later 14 officers – including Samuel W. Koster, the division's commanding officer – were charged with covering the massacre up. Most of the charges were later dropped, but Koster was subsequently demoted and stripped of his Distinguished Service Medal. For his part, Calley was charged, convicted and sentenced to life imprisonment and hard labor on 31 March 1971 for the murder of 22 South Vietnamese civilians.

President Richard Nixon soon intervened and on 1 April 1971 ordered Calley transferred from Fort Leavenworth to house arrest at Fort Benning, pending his appeal. Calley, the only person convicted for the slaughter of hundreds of innocent South Vietnamese civilians at My Lai, eventually served only three and half years of house arrest and was released in September 1974.

=== Transformation ===
The Army's evaluation of the Persian Gulf War and operations in the Balkans recognized the need for a rapidly deployable organization that could fill the operational gap between initially deployed light forces, which lack staying power, and the slower deploying heavy armored forces. The Army's answer, first called interim brigade combat team (IBCT), is today the Stryker brigade combat team (SBCT). A SBCT is an infantry brigade mounted on some three hundred Stryker vehicles. This designation was a direct result of the Army's concept of a medium weight, rapid deployable unit that was designed to project power with a sustainable fighting force. A Stryker is a 19-ton wheeled armored vehicle that is mounted in eleven different configurations with significant upgrades in firepower. Capable of being transported in a C-130 aircraft, this new weapon is the future of the modular Army.

The transformation began in 1999 with the conversion of the 3rd BDE, 2nd Infantry Division at Fort Lewis, WA to the Army's first Stryker brigade. As part of the reorganization, the 5th Battalion, 20th Infantry Regiment, who at that time was assigned to the 1st Brigade, 25th Infantry Division, was chosen to lead the transformation process. Thus, the unit was reassigned from the 1st Brigade, 25th Infantry Division to the 3rd Brigade, 2nd Infantry Division. As a result of the 5th Battalion, 20th Infantry Regiment's results in their transformation into a Stryker battalion on 1 February 2001, the 5-20 Infantry was awarded the Army Superior Unit Award.

=== Global war on terrorism ===
==== Iraq War ====
Sykes' Regulars have deployed three times in support of the Iraq War's Operation Iraqi Freedom (OIF). The 5th Battalion, 20th Infantry Regiment deployed to Iraq (OIF 2 & 3) from November 2003 to October 2004 with seven brother battalions, the 1st Battalion 23rd Infantry Regiment, 2nd Battalion 3rd Infantry Regiment, 1st Squadron, 14th Cavalry Regiment, 3rd Squadron, 17th Cavalry Regiment, 1st Battalion 37th Field Artillery Regiment, 296th Brigade Support Battalion and the 276th Engineer Battalion. Also fighting alongside 5th Battalion were: the 18th Engineer Company; Headquarters and Headquarters Company, 3rd Brigade, 2nd Division; 209th Military Intelligence Company; 334th Signal Company; Company C, 52nd Infantry Regiment; 1060th Tactical Psyops Detachment; and 1290th Tactical Psyops Detachment. On 15 December 2003 the battalion then rolled through the City of Samarra at intervals throughout the day.

Soldiers of 5th Battalion, 20th Infantry took part in Operation Sykes Hammer and patrolled the streets of Tal Afar, August 2004. They worked with the Iraqi National Guard in executing cordon and search operations in the neighborhoods of Tal Afar, which was successful in detained personnel, weapons and propaganda materials. In one year, the battalion operated in a larger area than what they had expected prior to coming to Iraq. The 3rd Brigade as a whole were called on to support major operations when violence heated up in Al Kut, Tal Afar and Najaf.

After coming home and going through their second reset the infantrymen of 5th Battalion deployed with the 3rd BDE, 2nd Infantry Division from June 2006 to October 2007.

Sykes' Regulars deployed from Ft. Lewis, WA to Camp Buehring, Kuwait. While at Camp Buehring Charlie Company was detached to 1-14 CAV. Task Force 1-14 later deployed from Camp Buerhing to Baghdad, Iraq where they spent the deployment bringing stability and security to the capital city. The rest of the Regulars deployed from Camp Buerhing to Mosul, Iraq relieving the 1st Battalion, 17th Infantry Regiment (Buffaloes) of the 172nd Infantry Brigade (SBCT). While in Mosul, Task Force 5-20 Infantry was responsible for western Mosul, Hammam Al-Alil, and the rural area west of Mosul. While in Mosul Bronco Troop, 1-14 CAV became task organized to 5-20 Infantry in Kuwait in exchange for Charlie Company. In November 2006 the Regulars received orders to move from Mosul to Baghdad. In late November 2006, TF 5-20 Infantry conducted a ground assault convoy from Mosul to Taji, Iraq.

Immediately upon arriving to Taji, the TF 5-20 Infantry launched into al-Anbar province to conduct search and rescue operations in support of a downed aircraft. TF 5-20 Infantry returned to Baghdad and began extensive operations throughout MND-B under 3-2 SBCT, 2-2 IBCT, and other MND-B maneuver forces. During Operation Arrowhead Strike, TF 5-20 Infantry worked with the units from 2-2 IBCT, marking the first time since the Korean War that two brigades from the 2nd Infantry Division operated jointly in combat operations.

In March 2007, the Regulars moved to FOB Warhorse located within the volatile Diyala Province in support of Operation Orange Justice. During this operation, TF 5-20 Infantry, working under 3-1 CAV BDE, grew to include Apache and Bone Companies 1-12 CAV. This task force cleared terrorists from Baqubah.

In June 2007, 3-2 SBCT, with 5-20 Infantry leading the way conducted a RIP/TOA (relief in place / transfer of authority) with 3-1 HBCT and assumed responsibility for Baqubah. This change in leadership lead to Operation Arrowhead Ripper, during which through close fighting and the employment of joint firepower, TF 5-20 Infantry routed al-Qaeda from Baqubah. During this time the Regulars, in addition to their combat duties, conducted humanitarian missions to help the citizens of Baqubah. Simultaneously while conducting humanitarian aid to the citizens of Baqubah, the TF 5-20 Infantry also conducted SASO to promote the confidence and proficiency of the Iraqi Security Forces stationed in the area.

The Regulars of 5th Battalion returned home over the span of three months beginning in August 2007. The last Regular returned to Fort Lewis on 7 November 2007.

Upon redeployment to Ft. Lewis, WA, LTC Bruce P. Antonia relinquished command to LTC Mitchell L. Rambin on 7 November 2007. After a period of reset and re-integration, the Regulars' Attack Company and battalion headquarters were tasked with representing the United States at the annual Cooperative Spirit exercise at Hohenfels, Germany in September 2008. These Regular elements trained alongside other units from the United Kingdom, Canada, Australia and New Zealand. Following this, the Regulars began a series of training events at Ft. Lewis and Yakima Training Center to prepare them for their upcoming deployment, culminating in platoon live-fire exercises at Yakima in February 2009. Immediately following, the Sykes' Regulars headed to the National Training Center at Ft. Irwin, CA to conduct their final training event before deployment.

In August 2009, TF 5-20 IN deployed once again from Ft. Lewis, WA to Camp Buerhing, Kuwait for their third deployment to Operation Iraqi Freedom. After receiving their equipment and training, the task force headed north to FOB Warhorse in the Diyala Province of Iraq. Immediately, Rock Company moved out to the Diyala Media Center Combat Outpost (COP) to begin their relief in place of the outgoing unit. On 3 September 2009, 5-20 IN conducted a RIP/TOA (relief in place / transfer of authority) with 1-5 IN Bobcats from Ft. Wainwright, AK. That same day the battalion suffered its first casualties of the deployment; SSG Todd Selge and SGT Jordan Shay, both of Attack Company, were killed conducting combat operations in Baqubah, Iraq.

In September, the Regulars more than doubled the size of their battlespace when they conducted a RIP with 2-8 FA, also from Ft. Wainwright, AK. In October, Attack Company and C/52 IN moved out east towards the Iranian border to conduct a RIP/TOA with TF 3-66 AR. On 1 Nov 2009, Attack and C/52 IN assumed responsibility for the Balad Ruz Qada. On 1 December 2009, the Diyala Media Center COP was officially relinquished to the Local Iraqi Security Forces (ISF) marking a significant step in returning control of local infrastructure to the Iraqi Government. In February 2010, Attack Company moved back to FOB Warhorse and FOB Caldwell was turned over to the ISF, marking another significant step in the drawdown of US forces in Iraq.

In March 2010, the Regulars oversaw the successful second free parliamentary elections in Iraq. In April 2010, Command Sergeant Major (CSM) William Gentry conducted a change of responsibility with CSM Joseph Dallas. CSM Dallas returned to the Regulars after working at the brigade as the Operations Sergeant Major. In May, the Regulars took over additional battlespace when they conducted a RIP/TOA with 2-3 IN Patriots and assumed control of the Muqdadiyah Qada. On 11 June 2010 two more Regulars were killed conducting combat operations in Jalula, Iraq: SGT Israel O’Bryan and CPL William Yauch. In July 2010, the Regulars began their redeployment to home station with the final Regulars' soldiers landing at Joint Base Lewis-McChord on 6 August 2010. The official RIP/TOA with 2-21 IN Gimlets from Schofield Barracks, HI took place on 25 July 2010. In the end, the Regulars had conducted four reliefs in place and assumed five separate battalions' battlespaces while helping train ISF to maintain security and working closely with ISF to increase government and civil capacity. In addition, their efforts were instrumental in conducting the second free parliamentary election in Iraq's history.

On 14 September 2010, the 5-20 IN colors were officially uncased during the brigade welcome home ceremony. On 29 September 2010, the Regulars bid farewell to LTC Mitchell L. Rambin after his three years as battalion commander and welcomed LTC Steven J. Soika as the incoming commander.

==== War in Afghanistan ====
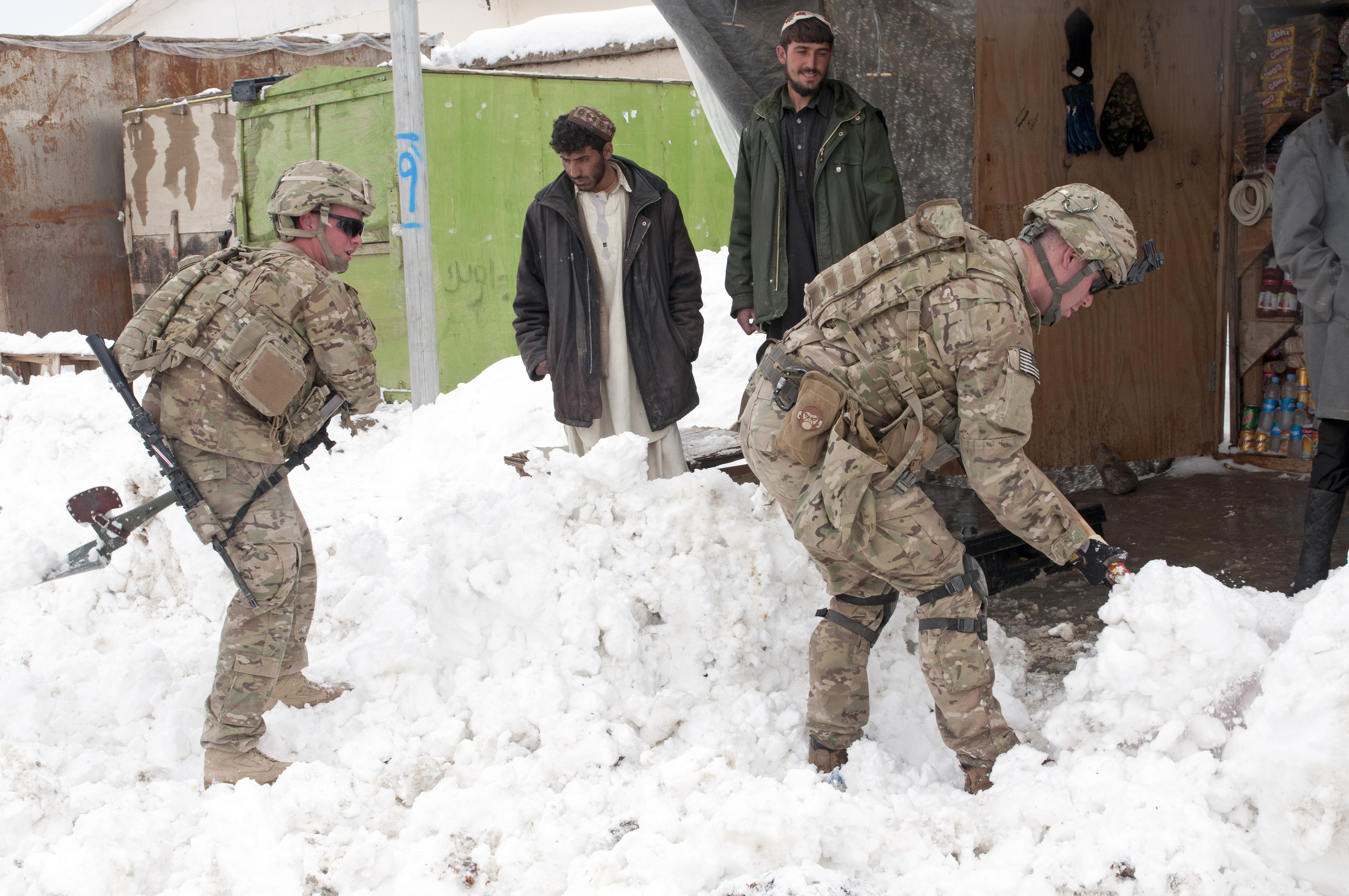
Snow clearance by the regiment for locals in Zabul Province

The unit deployed to Kandahar, Afghanistan from December 2011 to December 2012.

== Lineage ==
- Constituted 3 May 1861 in the Regular Army as the 2d Battalion, 11th Infantry
- Organized 6 June 1862 at Fort Independence, Massachusetts
- Reorganized and redesignated 6 December 1866 as the 20th Infantry
- Spring 1869 posted to numerous forts in the Department of Dakota
- December 1879 posted south to the Department of Texas
- Assigned 9 July 1918 to the 10th Division
- Relieved 14 February 1919 from assignment to the 10th Division
- Assigned 18 September 1920 to the 2d Division
- Relieved 16 October 1939 from assignment to the 2d Division and assigned to the 6th Division (later redesignated as the 6th Infantry Division)
- Inactivated 10 January 1949 in South Korea
- Activated 4 October 1950 at Fort Ord, California
- Relieved 3 April 1956 from assignment to the 6th Infantry Division
- Reorganized 15 November 1957 as a parent regiment under the Combat Arms Regimental System
- Withdrawn 16 August 1986 from the Combat Arms Regimental System and reorganized under the United States Army Regimental System
- Redesignated 16 August 1986 as Headquarters and Headquarter Company 5 Battalion 20 Infantry (Mechanized) assigned to the 2nd Infantry Division in Korea

== Campaign participation credit ==
- Civil War: Peninsula; Manassas; Antietam; Fredericksburg; Chancellorsville; Gettysburg; Wilderness; Spotsylvania; Cold Harbor; Petersburg; Virginia 1862; Virginia 1863
- Indian Wars: Little Big Horn; Pine Ridge
- War with Spain: Santiago
- Philippine–American War: Manila; Luzon 1901
- World War II: New Guinea; Luzon (with arrowhead)
- Vietnam: Counteroffensive, Phase III; Tet Counteroffensive; Counteroffensive, Phase IV; Counteroffensive, Phase V; Counteroffensive, Phase VI; Tet 69/Counteroffensive; Summer-Fall 1969; Winter-Spring 1970; Sanctuary Counteroffensive; Counteroffensive, Phase VII; Consolidation I; Consolidation II; Cease-Fire
- Global War on Terror: Operation Iraqi Freedom 03–04, Operation Iraqi Freedom 06–07, Operation Iraqi Freedom 09–10, Operation Enduring Freedom 11–12

== Decorations ==
- Presidential Unit Citation (Army), Streamer embroidered MAFFIN BAY
- Presidential Unit Citation (Army), Streamer embroidered CABARUAN HILLS
- Presidential Unit Citation (Army), Streamer embroidered MUNOZ
- Valorous Unit Award, Streamer embroidered BAQUBAH, IRAQ
- Meritorious Unit Commendation (Army), Streamer embroidered VIETNAM 1972
- Meritorious Unit Commendation (Army), Streamer embroidered IRAQ 2003–2004
- Meritorious Unit Commendation (Army), Streamer embroidered IRAQ 2006–2007
- Meritorious Unit Commendation (Army), Streamer embroidered IRAQ 2009–2010
- Army Superior Unit Award, Streamer embroidered 1999–2000
- Army Superior Unit Award, Streamer embroidered 2002–2003
- Philippine Presidential Unit Citation, Streamer embroidered 17 OCTOBER 1944 TO 4 JULY 1945
- Republic of Vietnam Cross of Gallantry with Palm, Streamer embroidered VIETNAM 1967–1968
- Republic of Vietnam Civil Action Honor Medal, First Class, Streamer embroidered VIETNAM 1967–1968

Company C, 5-20 Infantry additionally entitled to:

- Valorous Unit Award, Streamer embroidered AD DIWANIYAH, IRAQ
