= 11th Infantry Brigade (United States) =

- Shoulder sleeve insignia (approved 1966)
- Active: 1917–1921; 1926–1940; 1967–1971
- Country: United States
- Branch: United States Army
- Type: Infantry
- Role: Light infantry (1967–1971)
- Engagements: World War I; Vietnam War; My Lai massacre

Insignia
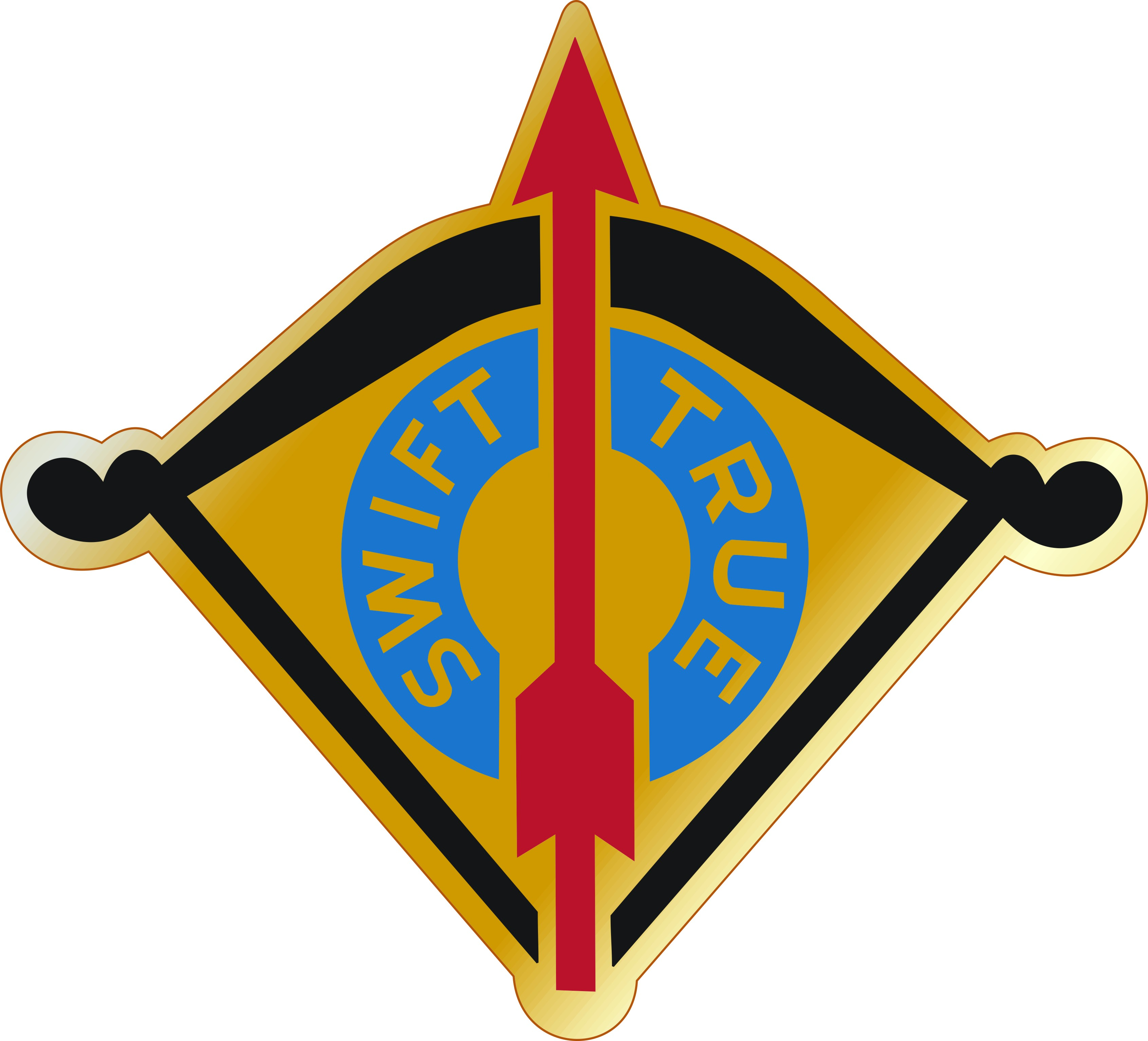
- Distinctive unit insignia (approved 1966)

The 11th Infantry Brigade is an inactive infantry brigade of the United States Army. It was first formed as part of the 6th Division during World War I. It is best known for its service with the 23rd Infantry Division from 1967 through 1971 in the Vietnam War as a light infantry brigade. The brigade is known for its responsibility in the My Lai Massacre.

== History ==
=== World War I ===
The headquarters of the 11th Infantry Brigade was constituted on 16 November 1917 in the Regular Army as part of the 6th Division and organized on 4 December at Camp Forrest. The brigade included the 51st and 52nd Infantry Regiments, as well as the 17th Machine Gun Battalion. The 51st and 52nd were formed in June of that year from personnel of the 11th Infantry Regiment.

The Brigade began its overseas service in June 1918 and spent 43 days in combat in France. It was commanded by Brigadier General William Dashiell. After the end of the war, it spent six months on occupation duty with the 6th Division near Aignay-le-Duc and Bad Bertrich during the Occupation of the Rhineland. The brigade returned to New York on 13 June 1919 aboard the USS Leviathan and briefly remained at Camp Mills before moving to Camp Grant on 17 June. On 6 May 1921 the brigade headquarters was redesignated as its headquarters and headquarters company (HHC). The brigade was inactivated there on 7 September. As Dashiell remained in France after the brigade departed, command passed to Colonel Erneste V. Smith in June, Colonel Charles B. Stone on 10 August, Colonel Carl Reichman on 5 October, Brigadier General Eli Helmick on 1 June 1921, and Colonel Frank B. Watson from 3 July to its inactivation.

=== Interwar period ===
The 11th Infantry Brigade served as the active associate unit for the brigade HHC in the event of mobilization between 1921 and 1927. The brigade was redesignated as the 11th Brigade on 23 March 1925, and its headquarters was organized on 9 September 1926 as a Regular Army Inactive (RAI) unit – manned with Organized Reserve personnel – at Chicago. The brigade continued to include the 51st and 52d Infantry, also organized as RAI units, and on 15 August 1927 was reassigned to the 9th Division. It returned to the 6th Division on 1 October 1933, and again became the 11th Infantry Brigade on 24 August 1936. During most of the interwar years after 1926, the headquarters participated in annual summer training at Fort Sheridan, while its regiments trained Citizens' Military Training Camp participants at Fort Sheridan or Camp Custer during summers. Known Organized Reserve officers who commanded the RAI brigade headquarters were Captain Henry Fulks (9 September 1926 to after June 1935), 1st Lieutenant Roy W. Dart (8 April 1936 to June 1937), and Major John A. Greene (June to after July 1937). The brigade headquarters, along with the headquarters of the 6th Division and 12th Brigade, participated in the Century of Progress parade on 27 May 1933 in Chicago. The headquarters was relieved from the 6th Division on 6 October 1939 when the army shifted from a square divisional structure with two brigades of two regiments each to a Triangular structure with three regiments that eliminated brigades. Four days after the relief of the brigade headquarters, the 6th was reactivated under the Triangular structure at Fort Lewis. The brigade headquarters was officially disbanded on 1 July 1940.

=== Vietnam War ===
The brigade HHC was reconstituted on 15 April 1966 in the Regular Army and activated at Schofield Barracks, Hawaii on 1 July of that year. The brigade was formed to replace the 25th Infantry Division, stationed at Schofield Barracks, after the deployment of the latter to Vietnam; it formed part of the army's strategic reserve. Its designation was selected under the assumption that the 6th Infantry Division would soon be reactivated. Organized as a separate infantry brigade, it initially also included three infantry battalions – the 3rd Battalion, 1st Infantry, 4th Battalion, 3rd Infantry, and 1st Battalion, 20th Infantry – as well as the 6th Support Battalion, a reconnaissance troop (Troop E, 1st Cavalry), and a military police company. However, a lack of the necessary personnel and equipment prevented the organization of the field artillery battalion, engineer company, and signal platoon that completed the structure of a separate brigade. Despite its reduced strength, the 11th began training and ultimately organized the remaining units at Fort Schofield. Its towed 105 mm howitzer direct support field artillery battalion, the 6th Battalion, 11th Artillery, was activated on 1 March 1967, followed by the 6th Engineer Company on 15 June. A fourth infantry battalion, the 4th Battalion, 21st Infantry, was activated at Schofield on 1 November.

The 11th Infantry Brigade was deployed to South Vietnam in December 1967 due to a need for additional American troops there, and during the Vietnam War served in the United States Army's 23rd Infantry Division (called the Americal Division). The 6th Engineer Company was inactivated on 15 January 1968, after the brigade arrived in Vietnam and reconstituted as Company C, 26th Engineer Battalion, remaining in support of the 11th LIB. Elements of the brigade were responsible for the My Lai massacre where members of the brigade's 1st Battalion, 20th Infantry murdered between 340 and 500 civilians in 1968. Many of its former servicemen were interviewed in the documentary Four Hours in My Lai.

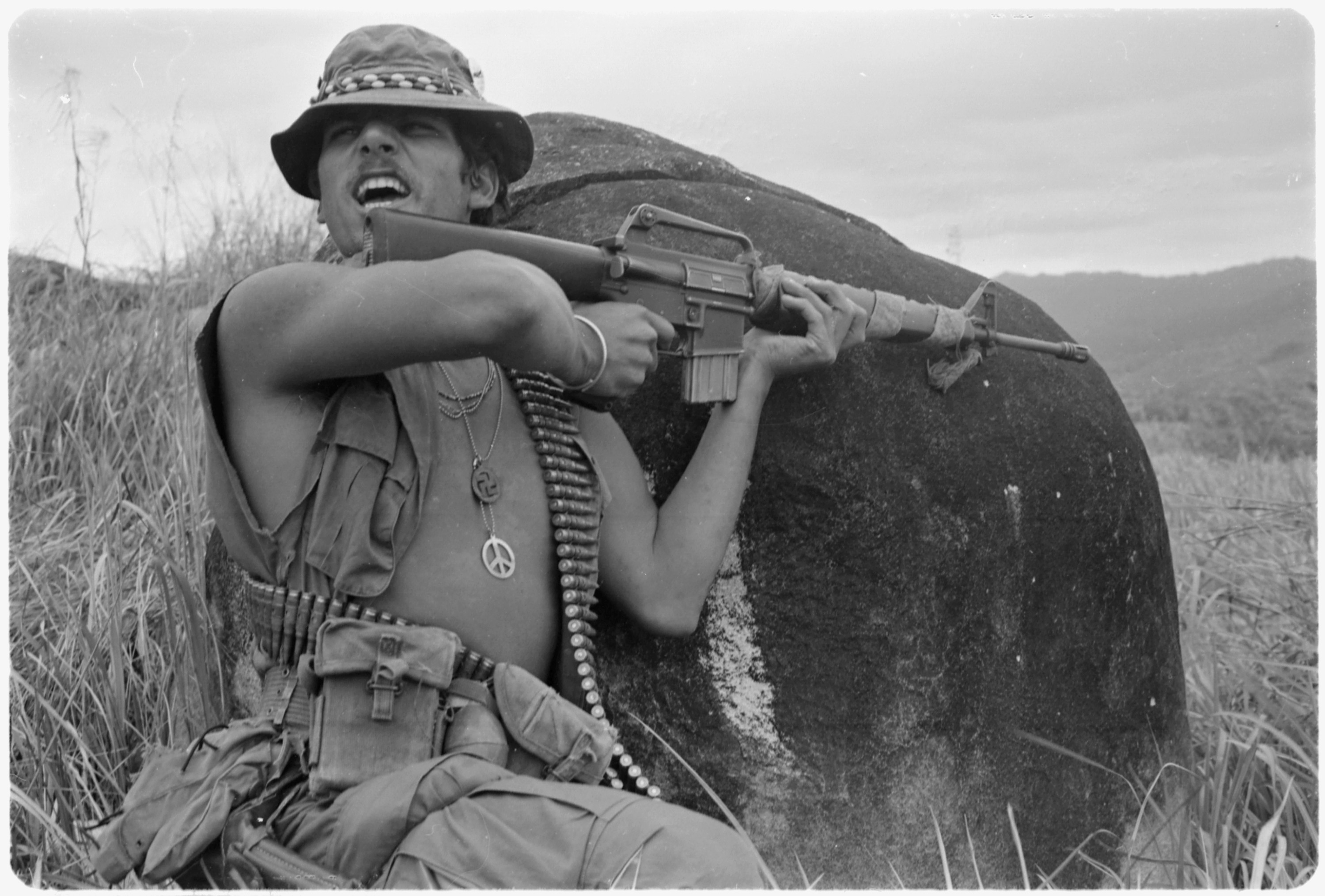
A 4th Battalion, 21st Infantry squad leader shouting instructions after taking sniper fire on a patrol southeast of Chu Lai, 1971

In June 1971, then Brigadier General John W. Donaldson, former commander of the Brigade would be accused and later acquitted of killing 6 Vietnamese civilians on two separate incidents in operations between November 1968 and January 1969, months of the My Lai massacre by taking pot shots at civilians. According to helicopter pilots and senior army investigators, the commanding and senior officers routinely murdered civilians while flying over Quảng Ngãi province, but the investigation was closed due to a lack of evidence.

Order of battle:

- Headquarters & Headquarters Company
- 3rd Battalion, 1st Infantry
- 4th Battalion, 3rd Infantry
- 1st Battalion, 20th Infantry
- 4th Battalion, 21st Infantry
- 6th Battalion, 11th Artillery
- 6th Support Battalion
- 6th Engineer Company
- 52nd Military Intelligence Detachment
- Troop E, 1st Cavalry

For its service in Vietnam, the entire 11th was awarded the Republic of Vietnam Cross of Gallantry with Palm for 1969 and 1970, while the HHC received the award for 1968–1969 and 1971. The brigade HHC was inactivated at Fort Lewis on 30 November 1971, along with the rest of the brigade. Its lineage is continued by the inactive 1st Brigade, 6th Infantry Division, which it was redesignated as on 16 April 1985.

== Honors ==
The 11th Infantry Brigade was awarded two campaign streamers in World War I and eleven campaign streamers and one foreign unit award in the Vietnam War.

Conflict	Streamer	Inscription
	Republic of Vietnam Cross of Gallantry (With Palm)	Embroidered "Vietnam 1969, 1970"
	World War I Victory	Meuse-Argonne
	World War I Victory	Alsace 1918
	Vietnam Service	Counteroffensive, Phase III
	Vietnam Service	Tet Counteroffensive
	Vietnam Service	Counteroffensive, Phase IV
	Vietnam Service	Counteroffensive, Phase V
	Vietnam Service	Counteroffensive, Phase VI
	Vietnam Service	Tet 69/Counteroffensive
	Vietnam Service	Summer-Fall 1969
	Vietnam Service	Winter-Spring 1970
	Vietnam Service	Sanctuary Counteroffensive
	Vietnam Service	Counteroffensive, Phase VII
	Vietnam Service	Consolidation I
