= Sơn Mỹ Memorial =

Memorial to victims of the My Lai massacre in Vietnam

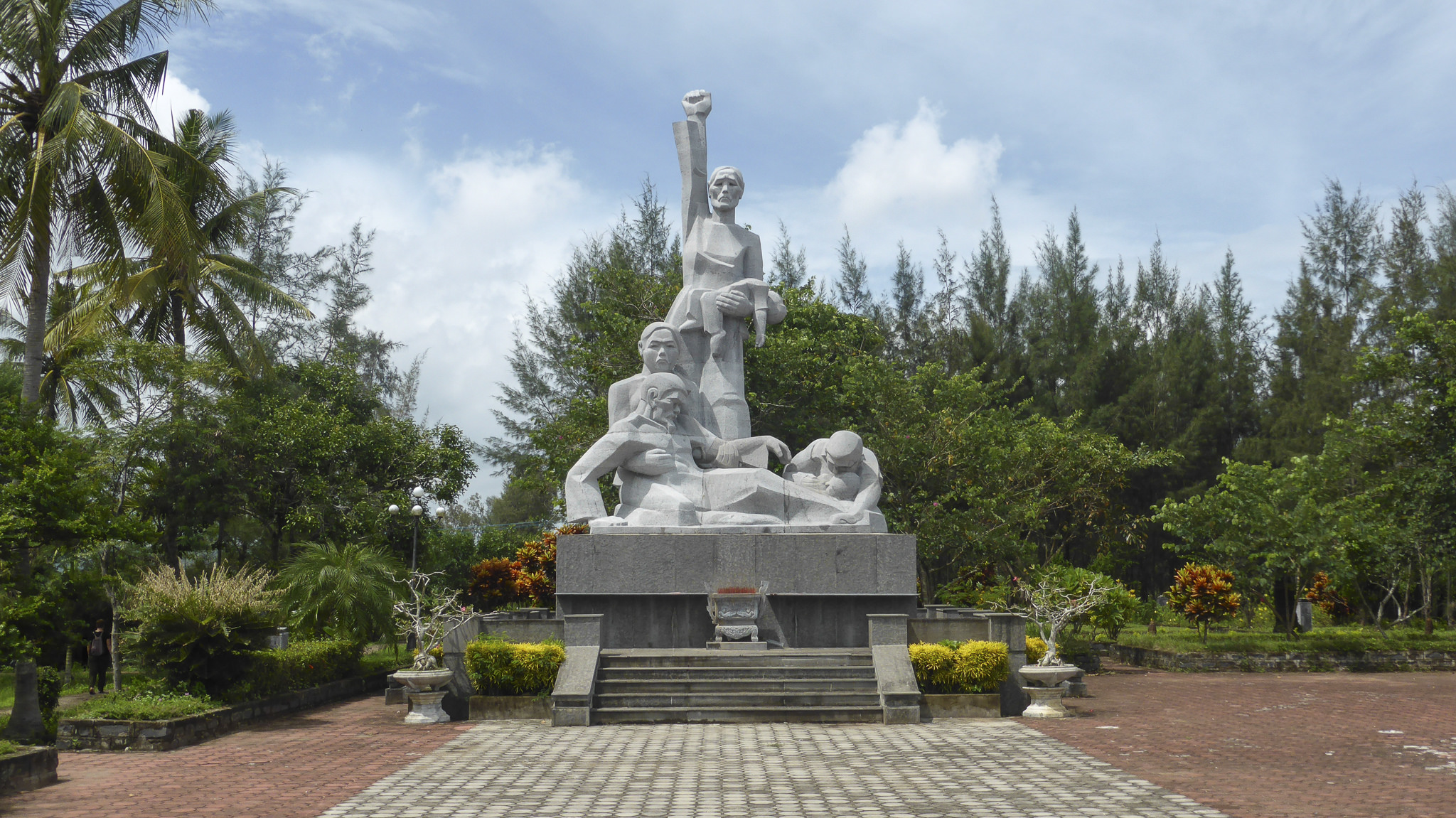
- Sơn Mỹ Memorial in 2013
- Interactive map of Sơn Mỹ Memorial
- Location: 15°10'48"N, 108°53'11"E
- Visitors: 47,000
- Dedicated date: 1978

The Sơn Mỹ Memorial (Di tích Sơn Mỹ) is a memorial to victims of the My Lai massacre, which took place on 16 March 1968 in Son My, Vietnam. This was a war crime committed by United States Army personnel involving the mass murder of unarmed civilians in Sơn Tịnh district, South Vietnam, during the Vietnam War. Mỹ Lai was actually the name of only one of four hamlets in the village of Sơn Mỹ in Quảng Ngãi Province. The event is referred to as the Mỹ Lai Massacre in the United States and the Sơn Mỹ Massacre in Vietnam.

The memorial includes a museum and a large monument honoring the hundreds of civilians killed by American troops. It is located at the site of the massacre in Quảng Ngãi Province and includes the remains of the village of Sơn Mỹ. A large black marble plaque just inside the entrance to the museum lists the names of all 504 civilians killed, including "17 pregnant women and 210 children under the age of 13". A number of enlarged versions of U.S. Army photographer Ronald L. Haeberle's photos of the massacre are shown inside the museum. The images are dramatically backlit in color and share the central back wall with a life-size recreation of American soldiers "rounding up and shooting cowering villagers". The museum also celebrates American heroes, including Ronald Ridenhour, who first exposed the killings, as well as Hugh Thompson and Lawrence Colburn, who intervened to save a number of villagers.

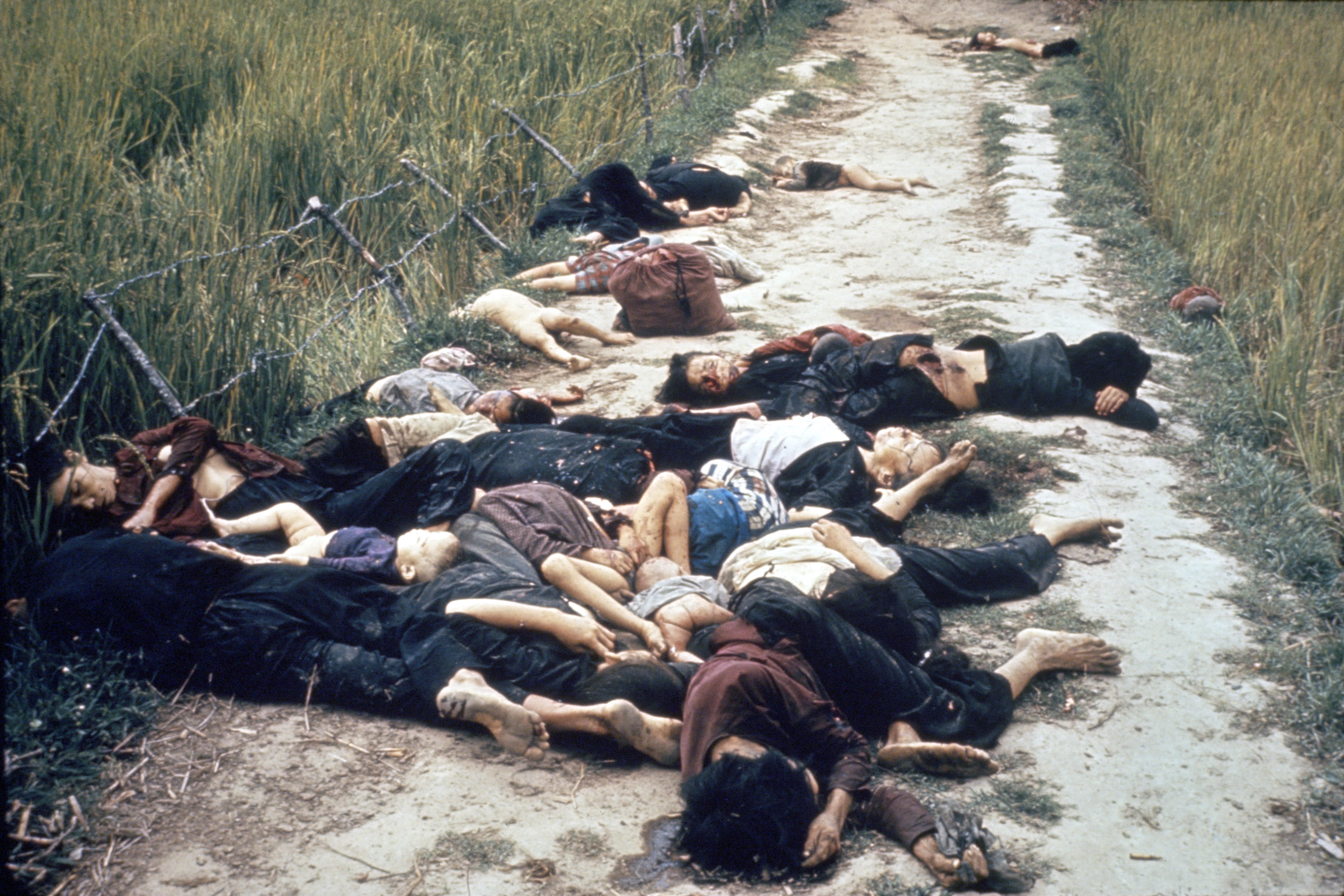
Photo taken by U.S. Army photographer Ronald L. Haeberle in the aftermath of the massacre, showing mostly women and children dead on a road.

At the center of the museum grounds, which is at the heart of the destroyed village, is a large stone monument in a socialist realist style, which was sculpted and donated by the Vietnamese artist Ho Thu, husband of Vo Thi Lien, one of the few survivors of the massacre; she was 13 years old at the time. The monument, built in 1978, is located within the outdoor compound of the Son Mỹ Vestige Site. A Buddhist prayer hall stands in the memorial complex, where monks perform rituals for the dead and for visitors offering presents to the spirits of the victims.

At the time of the massacre, Sơn Mỹ was a village that included Mỹ Lai and several other hamlets. Because Mỹ Lai was not the only hamlet involved, the Vietnamese refer to the event more accurately as the "Sơn Mỹ massacre". Sơn Mỹ was divided into four hamlets: Mỹ Lai, Co Luy, My Khe, and Tư Cung. The U.S. army designated the various sectors of each hamlet in the form My Lai (1), My Lai (2), etc. The massacre took place most notably in My Lai (4) (Xom Lang subhamlet) and in My Khe (4) (My Hoi subhamlet), but also in My Lai (5) (Binh Dong and Binh Tay subhamlets) and in Tư Cung.

== Gallery ==
Memorials and Monuments at Son My
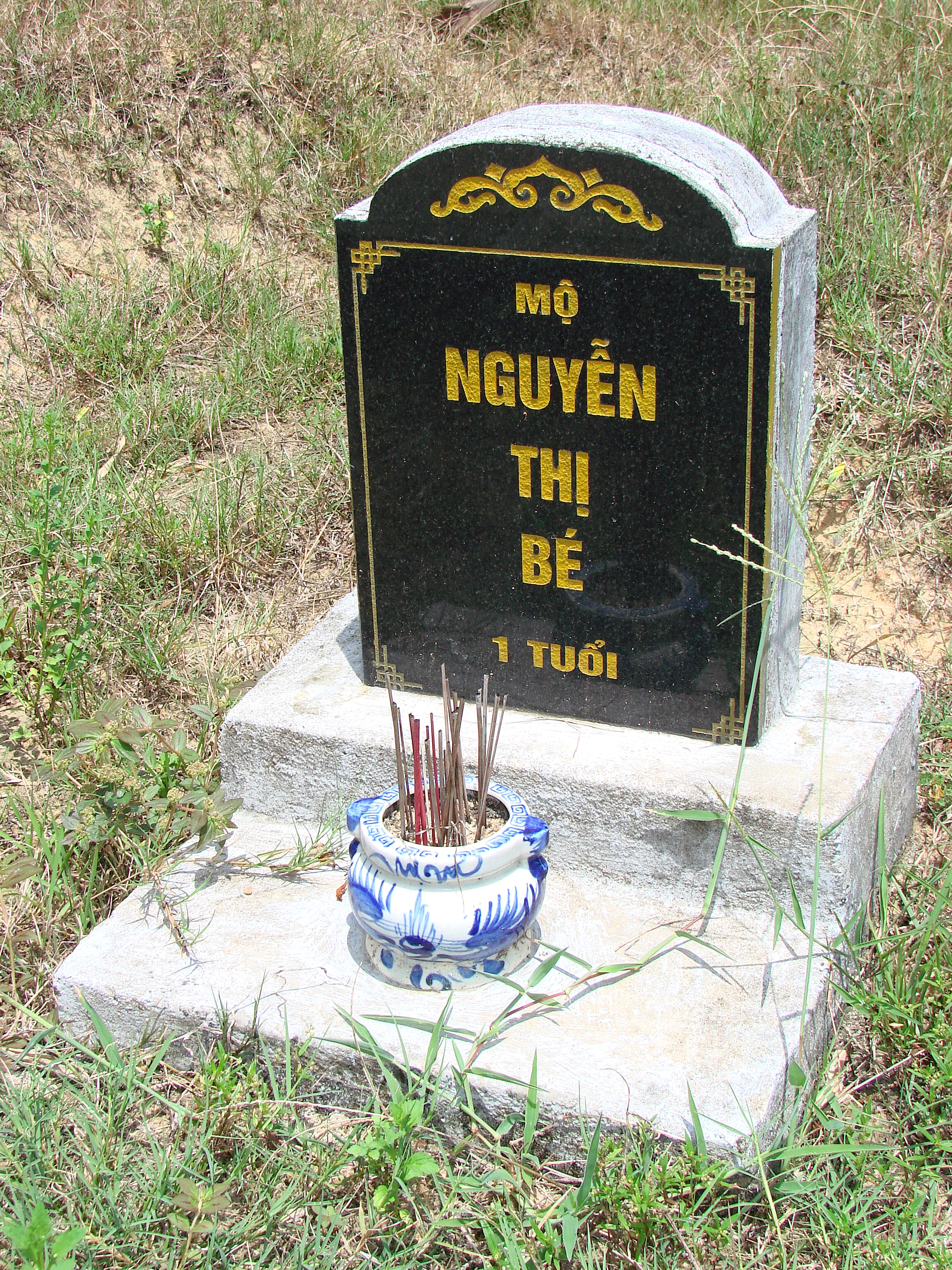
Grave of one-year-old child victim of the My Lai massacre, 16 March 1968

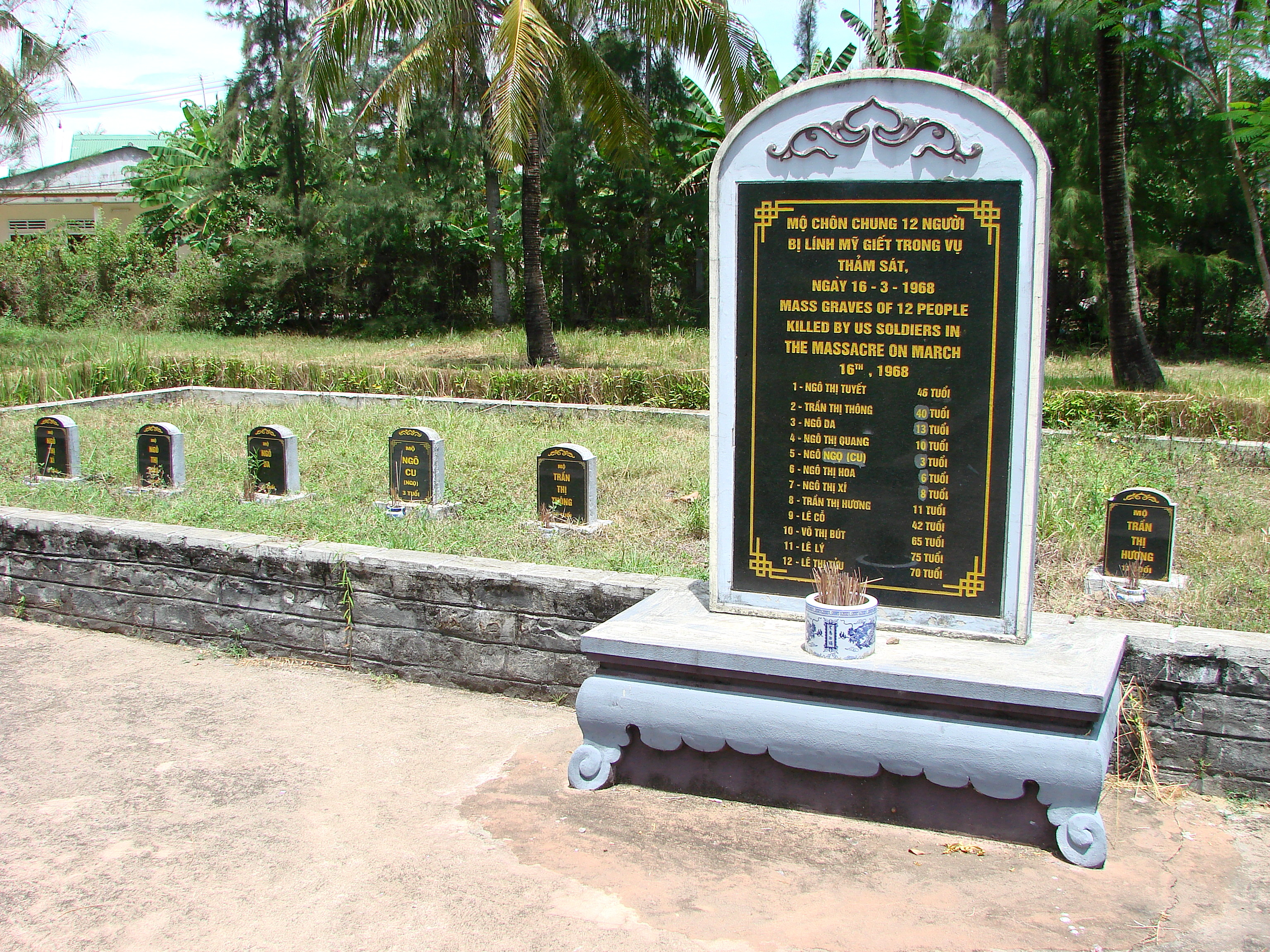
Mass grave for 12 victims of the My Lai massacre, 16 March 1968

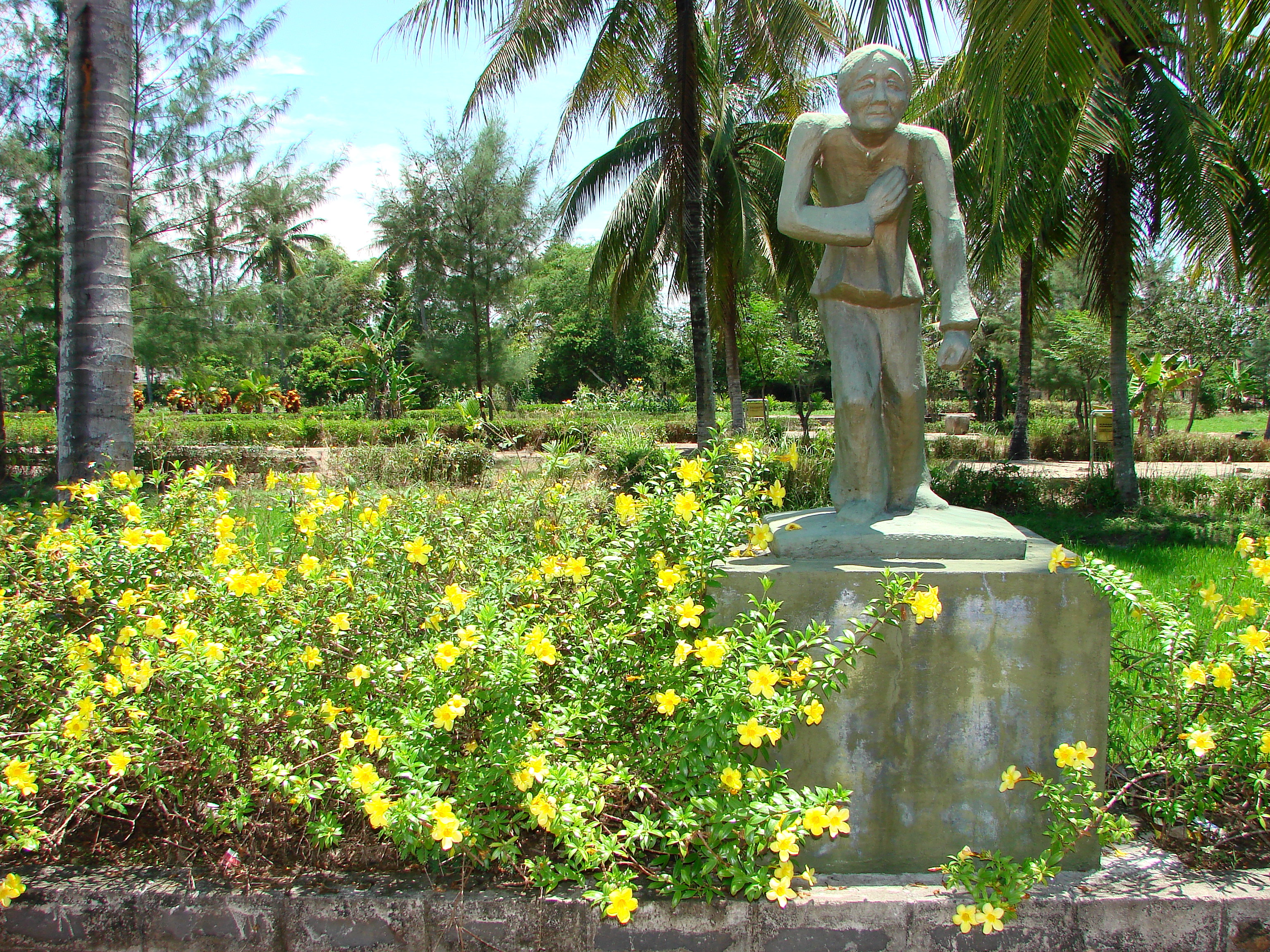
Sculpture in the garden of the My Lai massacre memorial site

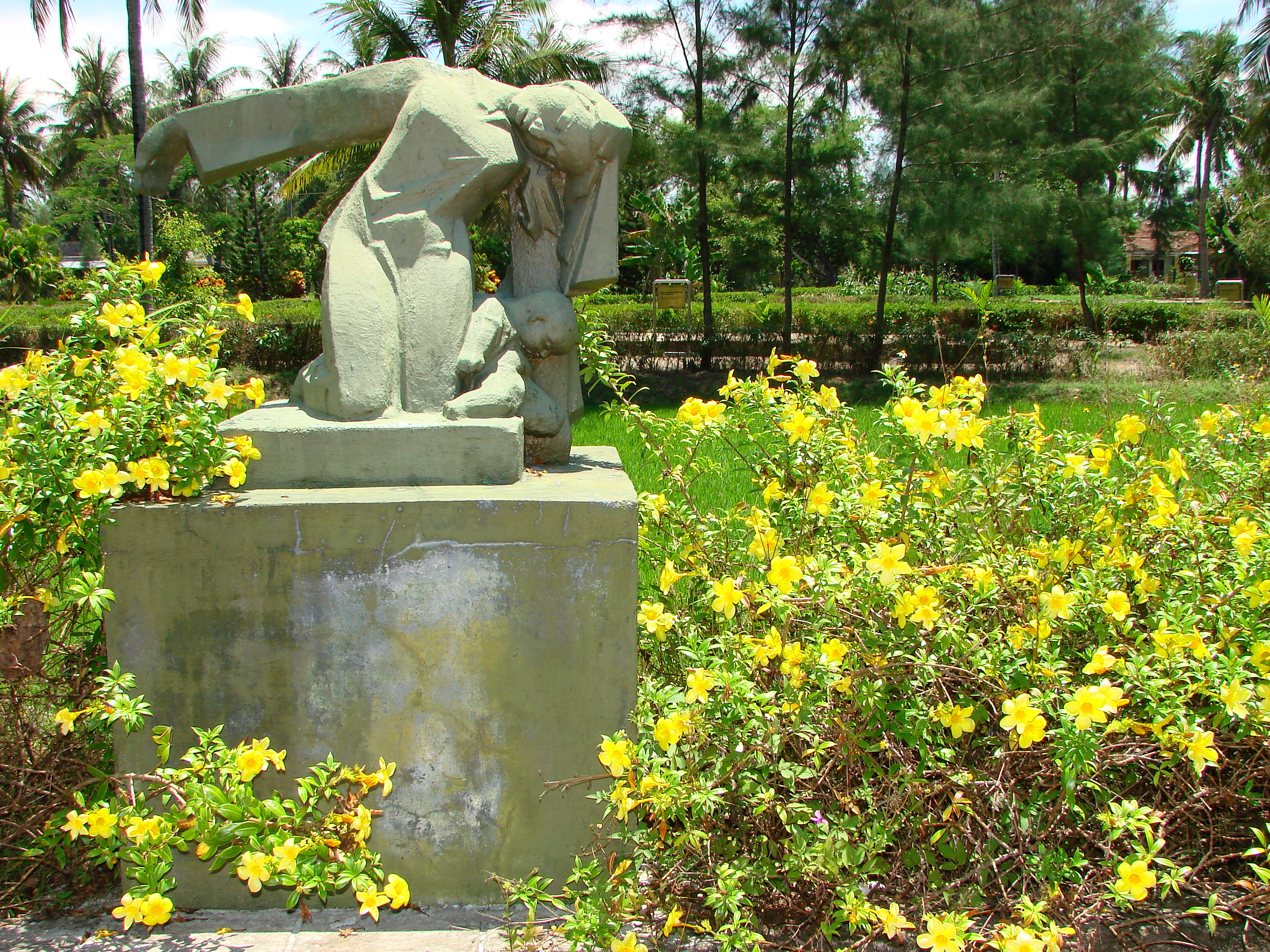
Sculpture in the garden of the My Lai massacre memorial site

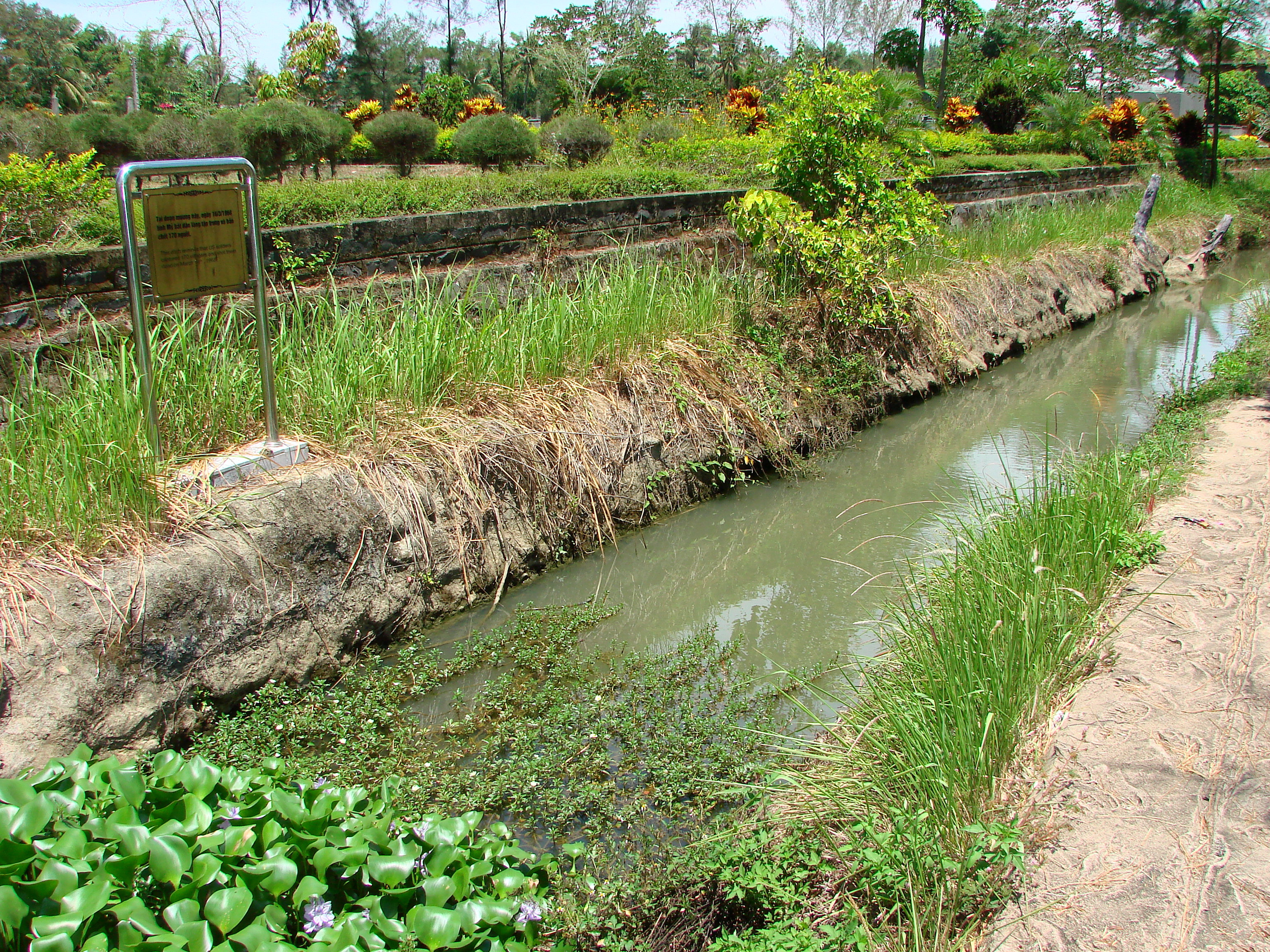
Memorial on the trench of 170 victims

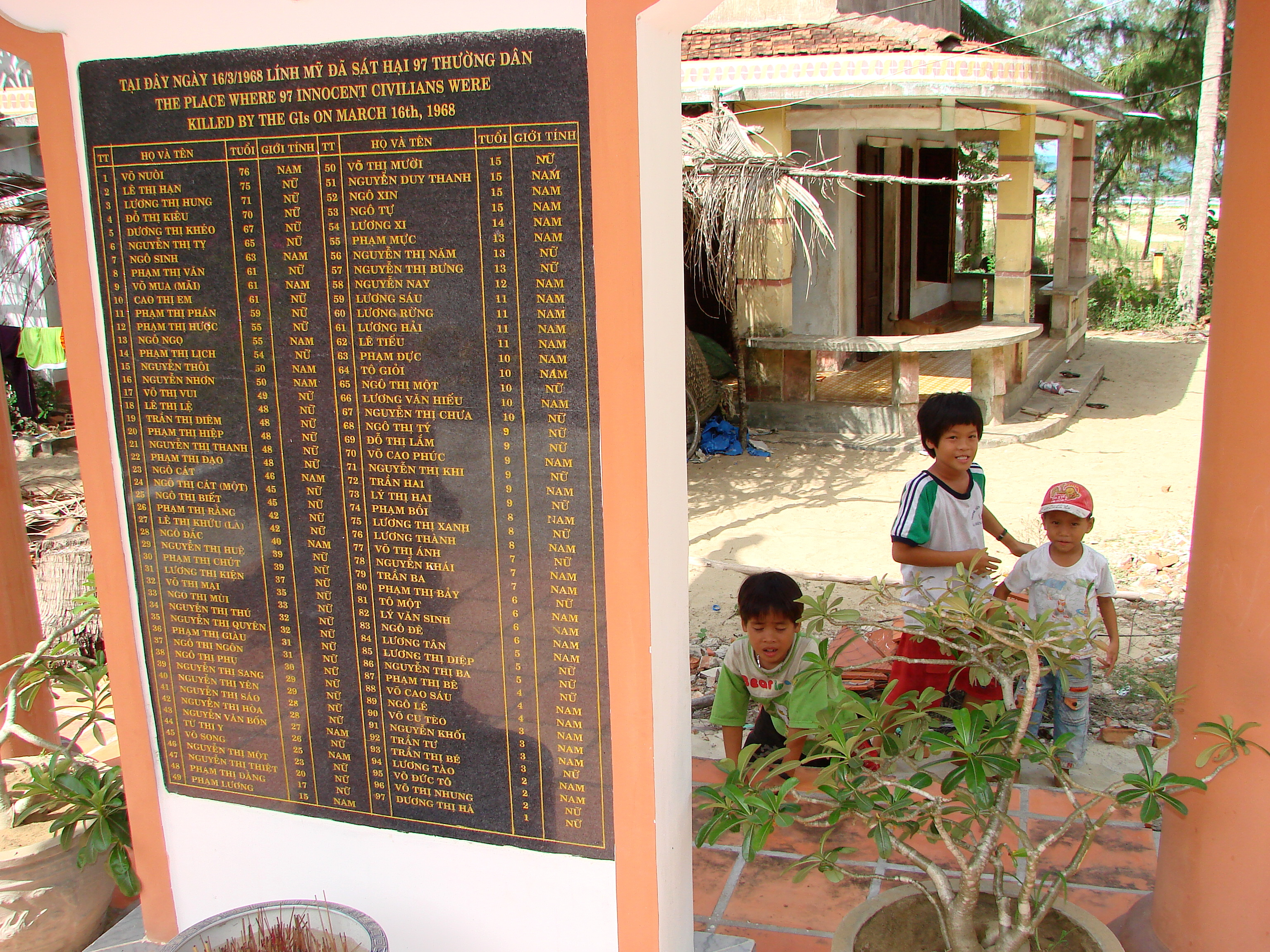
List of names and ages of victims from Cổ Lũy hamlet

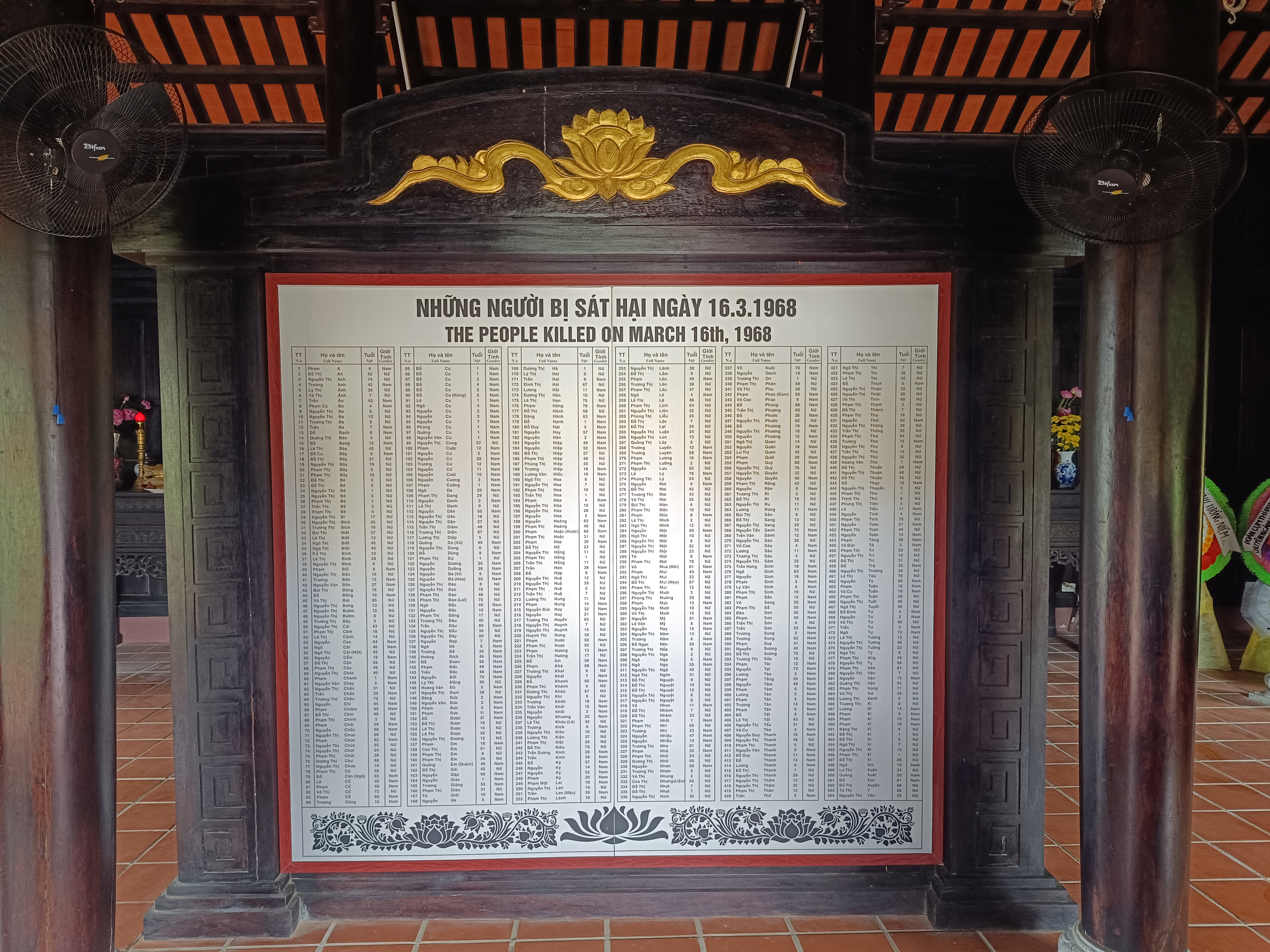
List of names and ages of all 504 victims of the massacre
