= People's Flag Show =

Exhibition in New York

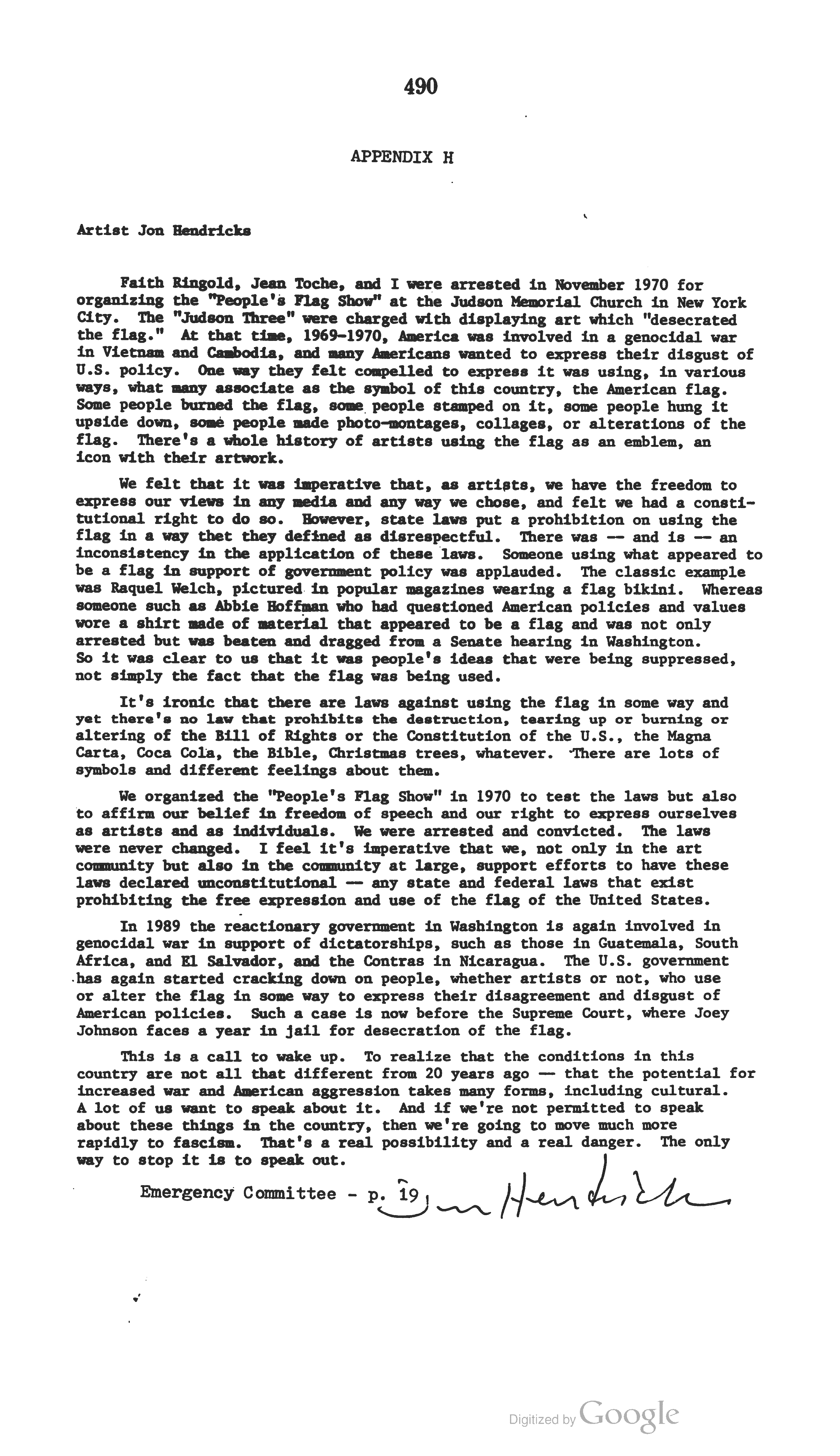
A statement by Jon Hendricks about the People's Flag Show during hearings on statutory and constitutional responses to the Supreme Court decision in Texas V. Johnson before the Subcommittee on Civil and Constitutional Rights of the Committee on the Judiciary, House of Representatives, 1989

The People's Flag Show was a November 1970 exhibition at Judson Memorial Church in New York City by Faith Ringgold, Jean Toche and Jon Hendricks, known as the Judson Three. The exhibition was raided by the police and the artists arrested on a charge of flag desecration. They were convicted and fined $100 each, but this was later overturned with support from the New York Civil Liberties Union.

The organizers of the exhibition wanted to test the boundaries of “repressive laws governing so-called flag desecration.” This intent was posted on a flyer calling for artist participation for the week-long event. While the exhibition was not explicitly an antiwar event, it grew out of the antiwar movement, with many of the works included in the exhibition referencing and in some cases expressing disapproval of the Vietnam War.

== Radich v. New York ==
The People’s Flag Show was inspired by the 1967 conviction of New York art gallery owner Stephen Radich, whose case was pending in the U.S. Supreme Court at the time of the 1970 exhibition.

In December 1966, Radich presented sculptures by artist Marc Morrel, who incorporated American flags into works of art criticizing the U.S.’s involvement in Vietnam. In 1967, following the exhibition, Radich was convicted of “casting contempt on the American flag," thereby “violating a state law against its desecration.”

Prior to his first appeal in 1967, Radich made the statement that losing the case “could affect the future of art galleries, a very important industry in New York whose right to show new work without interference from police could be severely threatened.” Radich's conviction was upheld by the New York State Court of Appeals, prompting Radich to appeal to the United States Supreme Court in 1971. After a vote of 4 to 4, with Justice William O. Douglas taking “no part in the consideration or decision of this case," the Circuit Court of Appeals ruled “that a tie vote did not represent an actual adjudication, thereby allowing for yet another appeal.” A federal judge finally overturned the conviction in 1974.

== Participating Artists ==
Other participants of the group protest exhibition included feminist writer Kate Millett, political and social activist Abbie Hoffman, as well as choreographer Yvonne Rainer.

In texts referencing Rainer's participation in The People’s Flag Show, the event is often referred to as the "Judson Flag Show.”

=== Yvonne Rainer’s Trio A with Flags ===
Rainer's contribution involved an iteration of her iconic dance, Trio A. This iteration of the dance, titled “Trio A with Flags,” was performed by Rainer and five members of the Grand Union dance troupe; Barbara Lloyd, David Gordon, Nancy Green, Steve Paxton, and Lincoln Scott.

The performers danced Trio A twice through wearing “only an American flag tied like a bib around the neck." The six dancers performed simultaneously but not in unison.

Rainer has stated that the performance was “a double protest,” against both censorship and war, and in her book, WORK 1961-73, Rainer writes, “To combine the flag and nudity seemed a double-barreled attack on repression and censorship.”

==== Re-performances of Trio A with Flags ====
Trio A with Flags continues to be performed today. On April 22 and 23, 1999, seven dancers performed Trio A with Flags at Judson Memorial Church as part of a benefit to help raise money for the church.

Trio A with Flags has also been restaged at the Museum of Modern Art, at the Joyce Theater with the Stephen Petronio Company, and at galas and other benefits to both celebrate and help raise money for institutions such as Printed Matter and Performa.
