= Hervé Fischer =

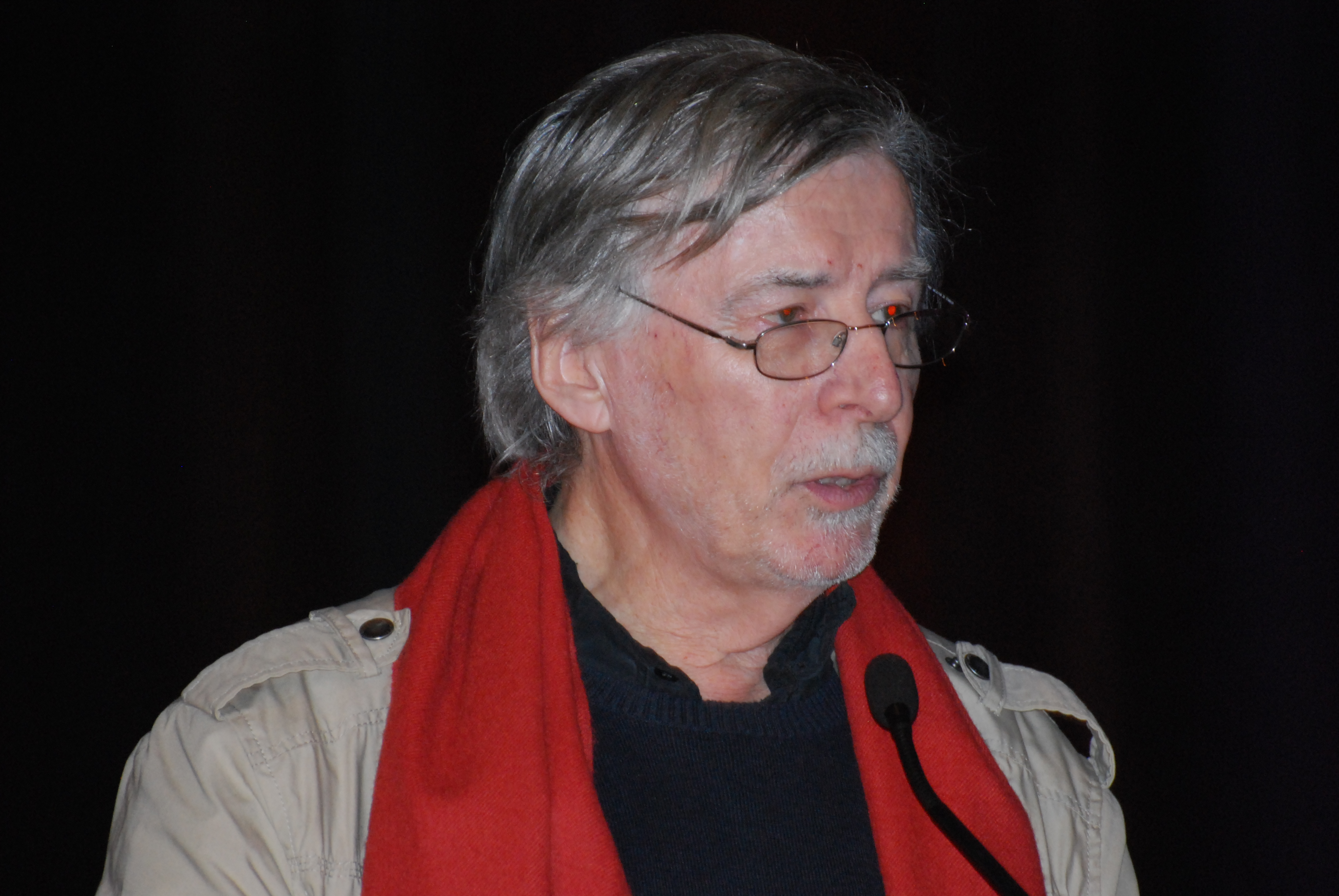
Hervé Fischer,2013

Hervé Fischer (born 1941) is a French artist-philosopher and sociologist. He graduated from the École Normale Supérieure (Rue d'Ulm, Paris, 1964) and defended his Master's thesis on Spinoza's political philosophy with Raymond Aron and devoted his main research to the sociology of colour. For many years he taught the sociology of communication and culture at the Sorbonne, where he was promoted to master lecturer in 1981. At the same time, he developed a career as a multi-media artist and creator of "sociological art" (1971) and initiated many public participation projects with radio, television, and print media in many European and Latin American countries before coming to Quebec. He speaks fluently French, English, German and Spanish.

== Biography ==
Born in 1941 in France, Hervé Fischer, a French and Canadian philosopher and artist, graduated from the École Normale Supérieure (rue d'Ulm, Paris). Hervé Fischer taught sociology of communication and culture at the Sorbonne. He obtained a master's degree in philosophy and a PhD in sociology. A multi-media artist and creator of "sociological art" (1971), he initiated many public participation projects with radio, television and print media in many European and Latin American countries before coming to Quebec. He was a special guest at the Venice Biennial in 1976, the Sao Paulo Biennial in 1981, and Documenta 7 in Kassel (Germany) in 1982. He had personal exhibitions at the Musée Galliéra in Contemporary Art in 1976, at the Museum of Contemporary Art in Montreal in 1980 (a retrospective), and Mexico in 1983. In 1985, he organized Franco-Canadian participation in the Marco Polo electronic novel project which involved writers from Africa, Europe and Canada, and was parrained by Umberto Eco and Italo Calvino. Since 1999, he is working again as a painter of the digital age. He had one man shows at the Museo Nacional de Bellas Artes in Buenos Aires, Argentine, (2003), Museo Nacional de Artes Visuales, Montevideo, Uruguay (2004), Museo Nacional de Bellas Artes de Chile, Santiago (2006), Museo Nacional de Bellas Artes, Neuquen, Argentine (2009?), Centro Wifredo Lam in La Havanne, X Biennale de La Havane (2009), Musée d'Art Moderne de Céret (2010–11), Museu de Arte Moderna de São Paulo (1976 and 2012). The Centre Pompidou-Musée national d'art moderne presents a retrospective of his work: Hervé Fischer et l'art sociologique, June to September 2017.

Hervé Fischer is co-founder of La Cité des arts et des nouvelles technologies de Montréal, the Quebec International Science Film Festival Telescience, the Multimedia International Market, and Science Pour Tous. Since 1997, he is also co-founder and president of the International Federation of Multimedia Associations. A member of the Canadian Committee of UNESCO.

He has been elected holder of the Daniel Langlois chair for Fine Arts and Digital Technologies at Concordia University, Montreal, 2000–2002, and developed the concept of a media lab, the Hexagram consortium between Concordia and UQAM Universities. Since 2006, he is associate professor, director-founder of the International Digital Observatory, UQÀM. In 1987 he co-authored and produced the 12-minute computer-animated film "Le Chant des Étoiles," which won a first prize in the international computer animation competition held by the National Computer Graphics Association (USA) in 1988. He was honored by the International Society for the Arts, Science and Technology with the first Leonardo (MIT Press) Makepeace Tsao Award.

In 2011 he starts what he calls tweet art and tweet philosophy, creating small digital icons syndicated on Twitter, with a philosophical and interrogative aim.

A member of the board of Artists for Peace, he received a Doctorate honoris causa from the Quebec Universities and delivers important lectures about digital technologies, art and mythoanalysis around the world.

== Bibliography ==
He has published numerous articles, papers and books on the sociology of art and communications, notably: Art and Marginal Communication (Balland, Paris, 1974), Théorie de l'art sociologique, Casterman, Paris, 1976; L'Histoire de l'art est terminée, Balland, 1981; Citoyens-sculpteurs, Segedo, 1981; L'Oiseau-chat (on the Quebec identity), La Presse, 1983; La Calle ¿ A dónde Ilega?, Arte y Ediciones, Mexico, 1984; Mythanalyse du futur (400 p., on Internet, 'www.hervefischer.net'), The Digital Shock, McGill and Queen's University Press, 2006, Le romantisme numérique, Fides and Musée de la civilisation, 2002, Les défis du cybermonde, (direction, Presses de l'Université Laval 2003), CyberProméthée, l'instinct de puissance, vlb, 2003), La planète hyper, de la pensée linéaire à la pensée en arabesque, vlb, 2004), The Decline of the Hollywood Empire, Talon Books, Vancouver, 2006), Nous serons des dieux, vlb, 2006, Québec imaginaire et Canada réel : l’avenir en suspens, vlb, 2008, Un roi américain, vlb, 2009, L'avenir de l'art, vlb, 2010. "Nouvelle nature", retrospective catalogue published by the musée d'art moderne of Céret, France, 2010.

- Art et communication marginale, Balland, 1974
- Théorie de l'art sociologique, Casterman, 1976
- L'Histoire de l'art est terminée, Balland, 1981
- Citoyens-sculpteurs, Segedo, 1981
- Mythanalyse et société, in L'oiseau-chat, roman-enquête sur l'identité québécoise 4e partie, éditions La Presse, Montréal, 1983.
- La Calle ¿adónde llega? Arte y Ediciones, Mexico, 1984.
- Mythanalyse du futur, 2000
- Le romantisme numérique (60 p., Fides et Musée de la civilisation, 2002)
- Les défis du cybermonde (direction, P. U. L., 2003)
- CyberProméthée, l'instinct de puissance (éditions vlb, 2003 et UNTREF, Argentine)
- La planète hyper. De la pensée linéaire à la pensée en arabesque (vlb, 2004)
- Nous serons des dieux (vlb, 2006).
- Digital Shock - Confronting the New Reality, McGill Queen's University Press, Montreal, 2006
- The Decline of the Hollywood Empire, Talon Books, Vancouver, 2006
- La société sur le divan. Éléments de mythanalyse (vlb, 2007).
- Québec imaginaire et Canada réel. L'avenir en suspens (vlb, 2008).
- Un roi américain - Denys Premier de l'Anse (vlb, 2009).
- L'avenir de l'art (vlb, 2010).
- Nouvelle nature (Musée d'art moderne de Céret, 2010).
- La Divergence du futur (vlb, 2014).
- La pensée magique du Net (Editions François Bourin, Paris, 2014).
- La postmodernité à l'heure numérique. Regard croisé Michel Maffesoli et Hervé Fischer (Editions François Bourin, Paris, 2016).
- MARKET ART (Editions François Bourin, Paris, 2016).
- L'Âge hyperhumaniste. Pour une éthique planétaire (Editions de l'Aube, 2019).
- Les couleurs de l'Occident. De la préhistoire au XXIe siècle (Bibliothèque illustrée des histoires, Editions Gallimard, Paris, 2019).
- Mythanalyse de la couleur (Bibliothèque des sciences humaines, Editions Gallimard, Paris, 2023).

== Exhibitions ==
=== Centre Pompidou ===
Herve Fischer's work is being exhibited at the Centre Pompidou, in Paris, France, until September 11, 2017. Artist, sociologist, thinker and researcher, Fischer today uses the idea of a sociological art that he developed in the 1970s to explore digital technology. Organised in three parts, the exhibition opens on the artist's work from the early 1970s to the mid-1980s, goes on to look at his work from the late 1990s to the present, before closing on digital practices and the new habits they bring.

== See also ==
- International Federation of Multimedia Associations
