= International Federation of Multimedia Associations =

- Federation Internationale des Associations de Multimedia
- Abbreviation: FIAM
- Formation: 1997
- Founder: Hervé Fischer
- Dissolved: c. 2010
- Type: Non-profit non-governmental organisation
- Purpose: Bring together various digital media associations around the world
- Location: Montréal, Canada
- Region served: Worldwide
- Official language: English and French
- Website: fiam.org

The International Federation of Multimedia Associations (French: Federation Internationale des Associations de Multimedia) (FIAM) was a non-governmental organisation to represent digital media associations around the world. The association was founded in Canada by Hervé Fischer and was headquartered in Montreal, with offices in China, Europe and Australia via Aimia.

== Mission ==
FIAM’s mission was to bring together the various digital media associations from around the world that represent small to medium enterprises developing services, technologies, and content. It also has an international network of partners, most notably the United Nations, via accreditation since 2004 under the ECOSOC economic and social program, UNESCO, the International Francophone Organisation, the Commonwealth of Nations, and Hispanic and Portuguese organisations as well as major corporations and foundations globally.

== Programs ==
FIAM provided support and guidance to an international community of economic, professional, and governmental partners. One such duty is as overseer between inter-governmental Public/private partnerships, such as the digital park in Shenyang, China.

== Events ==
Since 2004, FIAM hosted a yearly summit entitled "World Summit on Internet and Multimedia (WSIM)". In addition to the World Summit on Internet and Multimedia, FIAM hosted a variety of workshops.
