= Art Workers' Coalition =

Artist coalition (1969–1971)

The Art Workers' Coalition (AWC) was an open coalition of artists, filmmakers, writers, critics, and museum staff that formed in New York City in January 1969. Its principal aim was to pressure the city's museums – notably the Museum of Modern Art – into implementing economic and political reforms. These included a more open and less exclusive exhibition policy concerning the artists they exhibited and promoted: the absence of women artists and artists of color was a principal issue of contention, which led to the formation of Women Artists in Revolution (WAR) in 1969. The coalition successfully pressured the MoMA and other museums into implementing a free admission day that still exists in certain museums to this day. It also pressured and picketed museums into taking a moral stance on the Vietnam War which resulted in its famous My Lai poster And babies, one of the most important works of political art of the early 1970s. The poster was displayed during demonstrations in front of Pablo Picasso′s Guernica at the MoMA in 1970.

== Origins ==
The AWC grew out of an incident at MoMA during the exhibition curated by Pontus Hulten, The Machine at the End of the Mechanical Age. On January 3, 1969, Greek kinetic sculptor Takis, with the support of friends, physically removed his work from the exhibition. Although the work, Tele-sculpture (1960), had been purchased by the MoMA in 1963 and thus belonged to its permanent collection, Takis was unhappy with the museum's lack of consultation in choosing a work for exhibition which he considered no longer adequately represented his current artistic practice. The artist took his work into the museum's sculpture garden and remained there until he received confirmation from museum officials that his work would be withdrawn from the exhibition. The incident led to a series of meetings held at the Chelsea Hotel in which the group that had supported Takis's action discussed issues relating to the political and social responsibility of the art community. The group included Takis, American kinetic sculptor Wen-Ying Tsai, German conceptual artist Hans Haacke, American writer and independent curator Willoughby Sharp, co-founder of Avalanche Liza Bear, American artist and Village Voice art critic John Perreault, and American minimalist artist Carl Andre. On January 28, 1969, the AWC presented MoMA's director Bates Lowry with a list of 13 demands.

In 1969, the AWC released their collectively written "Statement of Demands" which was distributed as a pamphlet and later published in 1970.

In 1970, AWC organized an art strike to condemn the death of university students killed by police during Vietnam War protests.

== Statement of Demands (1969) ==
The demands were as follows:

A. WITH REGARD TO ART MUSEUMS IN GENERAL THE ART WORKERS' COALITION MAKES THE FOLLOWING DEMANDS:

1. The Board of Trustees of all museums should be made up of one-third museum staff, one-third patrons and one-third artists, if it is to continue to act as the policy-making body of the museum. All means should be explored in the interest of a more openminded and democratic museum. Artworks are a cultural heritage that belong to the people. No minority has the right to control them; therefore, a board of trustees chosen on financial basis must be eliminated.
2. Admission to all museums should be free at all times and they should be open evenings to accommodate working people.
3. All museums should decentralize to the extent that their activities and services enter Black, Puerto Rican and all other communities. They should support events with which these communities can identify and control. They should convert existing structures all over the city into relatively cheap, flexible branch-museums or cultural centers that could not carry the stigma of catering only to the wealthier sections of society.
4. A section of all museums under the direction of Black and Puerto Rican artists should be devoted to showing the accomplishments of Black and Puerto Rican artists, particularly in those cities where these (or other) minorities are well represented.
5. Museums should encourage female artists to overcome centuries of damage done to the image of the female as an artist by establishing equal representation of the sexes in exhibitions, museum purchases and on selection committees.
6. At least one museum in each city should maintain an up-to-date registry of all artists in their area, that is available to the public.
7. Museum staff should take positions publicly and use their political influence in matters concerning the welfare of artists, such as rent control for artists' housing, legislation for artists' rights and whatever else may apply specifically to artists in their area. In particular, museums, as central institutions, should be aroused by the crisis threatening man's survival and should make their own demands to the government that ecological problems be put on par with war and space efforts.
8. Exhibition programs should give special attention to works by artists not represented by a commercial gallery. Museums should also sponsor the production and exhibition of such works outside their own premises.
9. Artists should retain a disposition over the destiny of their work, whether or not it is owned by them, to ensure that it cannot be altered, destroyed, or exhibited without their consent.

B. UNTIL SUCH TIME AS MINIMUM INCOME IS GUARANTEED FOR ALL PEOPLE, THE ECONOMIC POSITION OF ARTISTS SHOULD BE IMPROVED IN THE FOLLOWING WAYS:

1. Rental fees should be paid to artists or their heirs for all work exhibited where admissions are charged, whether or not the work is owned by the artist.
2. A percentage of the profit realized on the re-sale of an artist's work should revert to the artist or his heirs.
3. A trust fund should be set up from a tax levied on the sales of the work of dead artists. This fund would provide stipends, health insurance, help for artists' dependants and other social benefits.

== 13 Demands ==
The 13 Demands that AWC submitted to Lowry were as follows:

1. The Museum should hold a public hearing during February on the topic "The Museum's Relationship to Artists and to Society", which should conform to the recognized rules of procedure for public hearings.
2. A section of the Museum, under the direction of black artists, should be devoted to showing the accomplishments of Black artists.
3. The Museum's activities should be extended into the Black, Spanish and other communities. It should also encourage exhibits with which these groups can identify.
4. A committee of artists with curatorial responsibilities should be set up annually to arrange exhibits.
5. The Museum should be open on two evenings until midnight and admission should be free at all times.
6. Artists should be paid a rental fee for the exhibition of their works.
7. The Museum should recognize an artist's right to refuse showing a work owned by the Museum in any exhibition other than one of the Museum's permanent collection.
8. The Museum should declare its position on copyright legislation and the proposed arts proceeds act. It should also take active steps to inform artists of their legal rights.
9. A registry of artists should be instituted at the Museum. Artists who wish to be registered should supply the Museum with documentation of their work, in the form of photographs, news clippings, etc., and this material should be added to the existing artists' files.
10. The Museum should exhibit experimental works requiring unique environmental conditions at locations outside the Museum.
11. A section of the Museum should be permanently devoted to showing the works of artists without galleries.
12. The Museum should include among its staff persons qualified to handle the installation and maintenance of technological works.
13. The Museum should appoint a responsible person to handle any grievances arising from its dealings with artists.

== Subsequent Activities ==
Upon receiving AWC's 13 Demands, MoMA met and held a dialogue with artist representatives from AWC that was publicly acknowledged. Lowry and MoMA, however, refused to meet all of the specific demands of the AWC, such as the demand to hold a public hearing on the topic "The Museum's Relationship to Artists and to Society". After organizing a number of demonstrations in front of the museum, the group held an open hearing at the New York School of Visual Arts on 10 April 1969. The event was retitled "What Should Be the Program of The Art Workers Regarding Museum Reform, and to Establish the Program of the Art Workers' Coalition." Some three hundred artists and members of the New York art community attended the hearing. The initial demands that had been made to the MoMA were debated within the larger group that formed during the open hearing, and later refined and addressed to all New York Museums. Artists and critics subsequently debated various subjects of contention including artists' rights, museum policy and broader political issues including the Vietnam War. On 15 October 1969, the AWC organized a successful "Moratorium of Art to End the War in Vietnam." The MoMA, the Whitney Museum, the Jewish Museum and a large number of commercial art galleries closed for the day. The Metropolitan Museum and the Guggenheim Museum did not comply, although, under pressure from the AWC, the Metropolitan did postpone the opening of its American painting and sculpture show scheduled for that day, while the Guggenheim was picketed. The coalition's activities eventually led to changes in how museums interact with artists, a contribution to the art world that is considered lasting in spite of the coalition's short three-year existence. The AWC ceased its activities at the end of 1971.

== Notable former members ==
- Carl Andre
- Frederick Castle
- Bahman Farman (visual artist, graphic designer, graffiti artist)
- Leon Golub
- Dan Graham
- Hans Haacke
- Jon Hendricks
- Frank Hewitt
- Leandro Katz
- David Lee
- Naomi Levine
- Lucy Lippard
- Lee Lozano
- Len Lye
- Howardena Pindell
- Irving Petlin
- Faith Ringgold
- Tony Shafrazi
- Seth Siegelaub
- Nancy Spero
- Takis
- Wen-Ying Tsai
- Hollis Frampton
- Gregory Battcock
- Ken Jacobs
- Judy Walenta (MOMA registrar)
- Alan Vega
