= Stephen Willats =

British artist

- Born: 1943 (age 82–83); London
- Education: Ealing School of Art
- Known for: Conceptual Art, Social Practice
- Notable work: West London Social Resource Project
- Movement: Social Practice

Stephen Willats (born 1943 in London) is a British artist. He lives and works in London.

Stephen Willats is a pioneer of conceptual art. Since the early 1960s he has created work concerned with extending the territory in which art functions. His work has involved interdisciplinary processes and theory from sociology, systems analysis, cybernetics, semiotics and philosophy.

== Works ==
His multi-media projects often engage visitors to participate in creative social processes. Notable projects include Multiple Clothing (1965–1998), The West London Social Resource Project (1972), and the book Art and Social Function: Three Projects (1976). Willats considers Art and Social Function as a "kind of manual or tool that would be relevant to any artist thinking of enacting different paradigms for an art intervening in the fabric of society".

Willats ran the Centre for Behavioural Art, a cross-disciplinary research and discussion platform he established at Gallery House, London, in 1972–73. The Artist as an Instigator of Changes in Social Cognition and Behaviour is a publication originally published in 1973 and re-issued in 2010 by Occasional Papers. The essay includes rigorous analyses of social forms of artistic production and descriptions of a number of projects by Willats.

He was invited by students at Edinburgh College of Art to participate in a three-day event on the theme of 'the artist and the community' in March 1972. This led in the following year to the development of the Edinburgh Social Model Construction Project focused on the communities of Leith, Morningside, Slateford and Silverknowes. Willats presented a paper about the project at the Computer Arts Society symposium on the Edinburgh Festival Fringe in August 1973.

His 1973 work Meta Filter consisted of pairs of participants seated at a computer, attempting to reach an agreement about the meanings of various images and statements.

He has produced a number of extended projects working with residents of public housing estates across Europe. Examples include Pat Purdy and the Glue Sniffers' Club (1981-2), The Kids are in the Street (1981-2) and Are You Good Enough for the Cha Cha Cha? (1982), about, respectively, wasteland outside the Avondale estate in West London, a skateboard park near a Brixton housing estate, and a London punk music club. For Brentford Towers (1985) Willats worked with residents to map the interiors of their homes, identifying objects holding personal significance.

His works are held in the collections of the Tate, the National Portrait Gallery, and the Henry Moore Institute.
