= Jon Hendricks (artist) =

American artist, activist, and curator (born 1939)

- Born: 1939 (age 86–87)
- Education: Studied at Atelier 17 with Stanley William Hayter
- Known for: Artist, curator, political activist
- Movement: Fluxus
- Patrons: Gilbert and Lila Silverman

Jon Hendricks (born 1939) is an American artist, curator and political activist. Since 2008, he has served as the Fluxus Consulting Curator of the Gilbert and Lila Silverman Collection at the Museum of Modern Art (MoMA).

== Art and activism ==
Hendricks' art career began in the late 1950s. He moved to Paris in 1959 and studied at Atelier 17 with Stanley William Hayter. In the mid-1960s, he was the director of the basement gallery at Judson Memorial Church in Greenwich Village, where he also performed and took part in happenings. Hendricks founded the Guerrilla Art Action Group with Jean Toche in 1969, and is credited as a member of the Art Workers' Coalition. In November 1970, he joined Toche and fellow artist Faith Ringgold in an exhibition at the Judson Church called the People's Flag Show, which resulted in a police raid and the artists' arrest for flag desecration.

== Curatorial and archival work ==
In 1981, Hendricks was enlisted by Gilbert and Lila Silverman to curate their collection of Fluxus documentation. He organized an exhibition of items from the Silverman collection at MoMA in 1988, which were on view in the Museum Library, two decades before the collection itself was donated to MoMA in 2008. In addition, he is a friend and artistic collaborator of Yoko Ono, serving as her curator and archivist since the late 1980s.
