= Jean Toche =

Belgian-American abstract artist and poet

- Born: Jean Xavier Van Imschoot; 1932; Bruges
- Died: 2018 (aged 85–86); New York

Jean Toche (1932-2018) was a Belgian-American abstract artist and poet involved in New York's radical political art scene.

== Career ==
Jean Toche was born in Bruges, Belgium, on 15 August 1932. He moved to New York City in 1965, where he became heavily involved in the radical political art scene. In 1969 he co-founded, with Jon Hendricks, the Guerrilla Art Action Group (GAAG). The group undertook organized actions designed to disrupt the art world, even on one occasion spewing animal blood in the lobby of the Museum of Modern Art. The group ultimately believed that the art world had been corrupted by profit and private interest, and used non-violent actions to ridicule art and media establishments.

In 1970 he was a co-organizer of The People's Flag Show, an exhibition of works made by artists using the American flag. The show was intentionally designed to test the flag desecration laws in effect at the time. With Jon Hendricks and Faith Ringgold, he was arrested for his participation in the show shortly after it opened. The three were ultimately sentenced to a fine of $100 each or 30 days in jail, under a New York State Law that forbade desecrating the flag.

In 1974 Toche was arrested by the FBI and charged with mailing a kidnapping threat to New York's Metropolitan Museum of Art. The threat, in the form of a flyer, called for the kidnapping of "museum trustees, directors, administrators, curators and benefactors". Toche's flyers were in reposonse to the arrest of Tony Shafrazi, who had spray-painted “KILL LIES ALL” on Picasso's Guernica, itself an act of protest against William Calley, who had participated in the My Lai massacre.

His work has been exhibited in the United States, Belgium, Germany, Italy, and Slovenia. He died in 2018 in Staten Island, New York.

== Collections ==
His work is included in the collection of the Tate Museum, London.
