= Garrison H. Davidson =

US Army general (1904–1992)

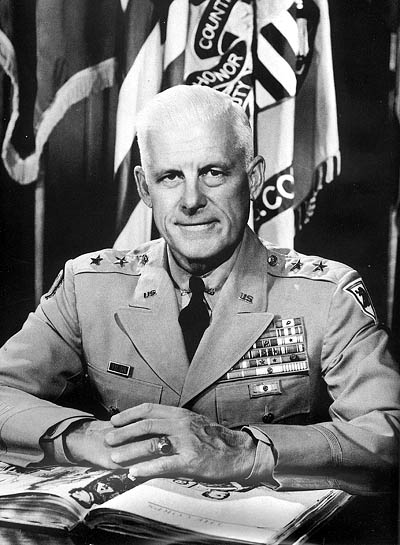
- Major General Davidson as Superintendent of the United States Military Academy, 1956
- Born: 24 April 1904; Bronx, New York, U.S.
- Died: 25 December 1992 (aged 88); Oakland, California, U.S.
- Military career
- Allegiance: United States
- Branch: United States Army
- Service years: 1927–1964
- Rank: Lieutenant General
- Nickname: "Gar"
- Commands: First United States Army; Seventh United States Army; United States Military Academy; Command and General Staff College
- Conflicts: World War II; Korean War
- Awards: Army Distinguished Service Medal (3); Silver Star; Legion of Merit; Bronze Star Medal

Garrison Holt Davidson (24 April 1904 – 25 December 1992) was a United States Army officer, combat engineer, commander, and military educator from the 1920s through World War II and into the Cold War-era. Commissioned as one of the youngest generals during World War II, he achieved the rank of lieutenant general before his mandatory retirement from the army in 1964. Davidson served as the Superintendent of the United States Military Academy from 1956 to 1960. He also played and coached football at West Point, helming the cadet squad as head coach from 1933 to 1937, compiling a record of 35–11–1.

== Education and early military career ==
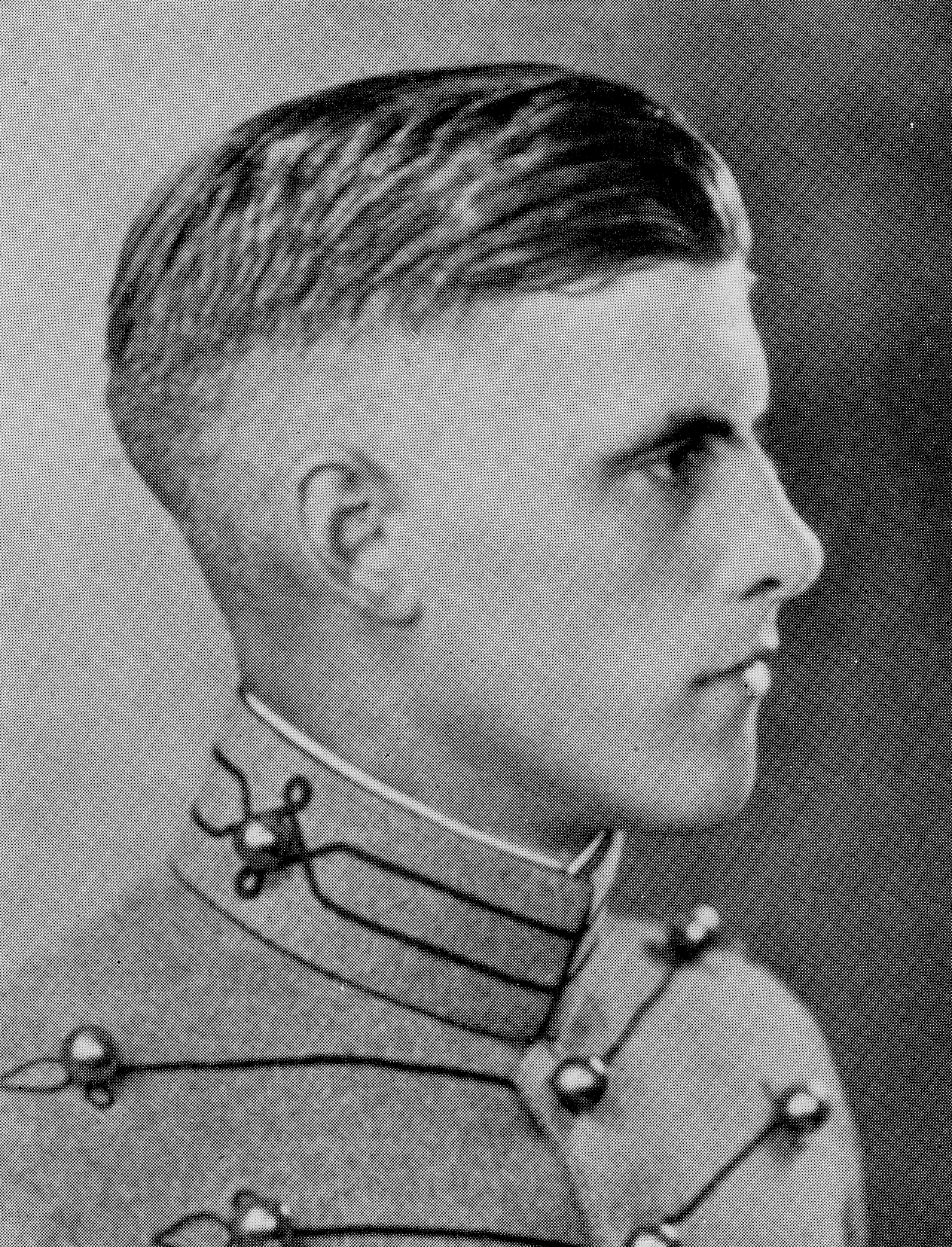
At West Point in 1927

Davidson was born in the Bronx, New York City on 24 April 1904, the son of a New York National Guard officer. In 1923, he graduated from the prestigious Stuyvesant High School in New York City, where he was a star on the school's championship football team and a member of the Omega Gamma Delta fraternity.

Davidson realized his boyhood dream of becoming a soldier when he was appointed to the United States Military Academy at West Point, New York. There, he distinguished himself in football and graduated with the Class of 1927. Upon graduation, he was commissioned a second lieutenant in the Corps of Engineers with the 1st Engineer Regiment at Fort DuPont, Delaware, and maintained a West Point connection as an assistant Army football coach.

In 1930, Davidson returned to West Point as a philosophy instructor and assistant football coach. In 1933, at age 29, he became youngest head football coach at the academy, finishing five seasons later in the 1937 with a record of 35 wins, 11 losses and 1 tie. From 1938 to 1940 he was posted to Hawaii as a company commander with the 3rd Engineer Regiment. In 1940, he returned to California as the post engineer for Hamilton Army Airfield (now known as Hamilton Air Force Base) on the north shore of the San Francisco Bay. At the time of Davidson's arrival, Hamilton's mission was being expanded from that of a bomber base with the addition of six squadrons of Curtiss P-40 Warhawk and Curtiss P-36 Hawk fighter planes.

== World War II ==
In February 1942, Davidson transferred to Washington, D.C. as assistant chief, Construction Division, Office of Chief Engineer, working for Colonel Leslie Groves on the construction of The Pentagon.

By October 1942, Davidson was a colonel and assistant chief engineer for the Western Task Force of Operation Torch of the Allied North Africa under the command of General George S. Patton. As the 1st Armored Division moved to invade Sicily in June 1943, it was activated into Seventh United States Army, and Davidson became its chief engineering officer. As a combat engineer, he facilitated the Seventh Army's landing in Sicily and enabled Patton's armor to move rapidly across enemy territory.

An appreciative Patton used one of his own general stars to honor Davidson in a September 1943 battlefield promotion to brigadier general, one of the youngest of the war at age 39. Davidson remained with the Seventh Army until the end of the war under its interim command by General Mark W. Clark and then General Alexander Patch and was key in planning for Operation Anvil / Operation Dragoon, the Allied landing in southern France.

Originally planned as Operation Anvil, intended to be simultaneous with the June 1944 D-Day invasion of Normandy, but was deferred until August 1944 due to the lack of resources to accomplish both landings. This second invasion liberated southern France and opened more ports to the Allied advance through France, providing nearly a third of supplies for the western front.

At the conclusion of the war, he was an engineer with the post-war occupation Fifteenth United States Army and served as president of the first Nuremberg War Crimes Tribunal for military defendants.

== Korean War ==
After World War II, in 1946, Davidson was assigned to Sixth United States Army as its chief engineer and in 1948 became chief of staff for General Mark W. Clark and General Albert C. Wedemeyer at the Presidio of San Francisco. In July 1950, he was called to Korea by Eighth United States Army Commanding General Walton H. Walker, who also served under Patton in World War II, directed Davidson to construct a defensive line protecting the Pusan Perimeter. Known as "Line Davidson", Davidson had to subvert his professional better judgment to construct the line to the preferences of General Douglas MacArthur and Walker, trading away defensibility and good internal communications.

As the North Korean invasion was repelled, Davidson was assigned to the 24th Infantry Division as its assistant commander. Davidson reprised his effort at fortifying a more defensible perimeter around Pusan with the second North Korean invasion. He then headed "Task Force Davidson" as it broke out of the perimeter to hook up with the forces invading south from Inchon. Afterwards, he constructed fortifications north of Seoul. He concluded his tour of duty as acting commander of the Korean Military Assistance Group.

== Military educator and Cold War warrior ==
Returning from Korea, from 1951 to 1954 Davidson was the senior ground forces advisor in the Weapons System Evaluation Group at the Pentagon and while there was promoted to major general in 1952. During the next six years, Davidson played a significant role in training officers serving in the post-war and atomic eras. Starting in 1954 he was commander of the United States Army's Command and General Staff College at Fort Leavenworth, Kansas, then in 1956 he returned to the United States Military Academy as its superintendent. There he began a process of slowly prevailing over strong traditionalist viewpoints, breaking barriers and initiating a process of revision and modernization of the academy's instructional program little changed since the academy's legendary superintendent Sylvanus Thayer from 1817 to 1833. The momentum and progress of his reforms continued more easily through the superintendency of his successor, William Westmoreland and into the 1970s. In 1957, while at West Point, he was promoted and confirmed to the rank of lieutenant general.

After West Point, Davidson returned to Seventh United States Army as its commanding general, posted in West Germany as a forward deployed force during the Cold War. During the Berlin Wall crisis in the summer of 1961, Davidson would have commanded any American military response or intervention.

In 1962, Davidson's final command was of First United States Army, headquartered at Fort Jay, Governors Island, New York. While there he also served as United States Military Representative to the United Nations. After a 37-year military career, Davidson reached the mandatory retirement age and retired from active duty on 30 April 1964.

== Retirement ==
Davidson moved to California and served as a vice president at University of California, Berkeley. He resumed his connection with West Point from 1983 to 1985, when he was appointed by President Ronald Reagan for a two-year term to the United States Military Academy Board of Visitors.

Davidson died in Oakland, California, on 25 December 1992, and was buried at the West Point Cemetery. The inscription on his gravestone reads: "Soldier, Coach, Educator and His Best Teammate", the latter reference to his wife of 58 years, Verone Gruenther Davidson who died in 1996 and was the sister of a former NATO commander, General Alfred M. Gruenther.

== Personal ==
Davidson was the son of Henry Fletcher Davidson (1877–1961) and Frances Aubrey (Holt) Davidson (1883–1913). His younger brother Marshall Bowman Davidson became a writer of non-fiction works on history and American culture. Their uncle was motion picture actor Jack Holt. After their mother's death, their father married Helen Gladys Scannevin in 1915.

Davidson married Verone Gruenther on 21 June 1934, in Omaha, Nebraska. At the time of his death, Garrison was survived by three sons, Garrison Holt Jr., of Los Angeles, Thomas M., of Darien, Conn., and Alan R., of Sarasota, Fla.; three daughters, Linda L. Hurst, of San Luis Obispo, California, Bonnie Elaine Bardellini and Gail Marie Davidson, both of Martinez, California; 14 grandchildren, and 2 great-grandchildren.

== Head coaching record ==
Garrison H. Davidson
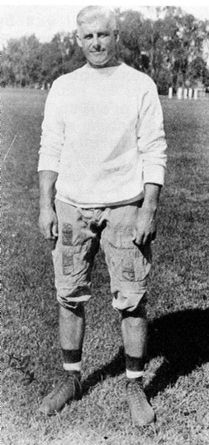

Playing career
- 1924–1926: Army

Coaching career (HC unless noted)
- 1927–1932: Army (assistant)
- 1933–1937: Army

Head coaching record
- Overall: 35–11–1

Year	Team	Overall	Conference	Standing	Bowl/playoffs
Army Cadets (Independent) (1933–1937)
1933	Army	9–1			
1934	Army	7–3			
1935	Army	6–2–1			
1936	Army	6–3			
1937	Army	7–2			
Army:		35–11–1			
Total:		35–11–1			

Military offices
Preceded by Charles E. Beauchamp	Commandant of the Command and General Staff College; July 1954 – July 1956	Succeeded by Lionel C. McGarr
Preceded by Blackshear M. Bryan	Superintendents of the United States Military Academy; 1956–1960	Succeeded by William Westmoreland
Preceded by John C. Oakes	Commanding General – Seventh United States Army; 1 July 1960 – 30 March 1962	Succeeded by Francis William Farrell
Preceded by Edward J. O'Neill	Commanding General – First United States Army; 1 April 1962 – 30 April 1964	Succeeded by Robert W. Porter, Jr.
