= Matt Lipps =

American photographer and artist

Matt Lipps (born 1975) is an American photographer and artist.

== Early life and education ==
Lipps was born in 1975 in Oakland, California. He currently lives and works in Los Angeles, California. He earned a MFA in Studio Art from the University of California, Irvine in 2004. Lipps took his BFA in Photography from California State University, Long Beach in 1998. He teaches at the University of California, Los Angeles and San Francisco State University.

== Work ==
Matt Lipps has spent the past decade focusing on the relationship between sculpture and photography. His photo-sculptures "simultaneously catalogue, lament, and celebrate photography's 21st-century transformations." His artistic process is methodical, often following a set of guidelines that transform his collaged elements into a unified composition and narrative. His photographic constructions rely on collage strategies, sculptural tropes and theater staging techniques. Lipps uses cut-out images that he finds in discontinued photographic publications and magazines, arranging these images to create still life photographs. He then photographs these scenes using a large format analog camera.

=== Looking Through Pictures (2016) ===
In his more recent "Looking Through Pictures" series, Lipps explores the genre of still life in relation to the mise-en-scène of theatrical spaces and productions. In this series models, floral arrangements, modernist sculpture and architecture are recurrent images. Lipps incorporates negative space into his compositions, which act as a counterbalance to the traditional photographic elements present in his compositions.

=== Library (2013-2014) ===
Lipps's Library series (2013-2014) stems from the 17-volume Library of Photography, an at-home photography primer published in the early 1970s by Time Life, Inc. Lipps builds structures for the cut-out images, allowing each image to act as a freestanding, movable 'actor'. Lipps places the cut outs on glass shelves over an enlarged, brightly colored photograph, recreating each volume in the Library as a unique Wunderakammer.

Using similar staging techniques as in his previous works, Lipps allows each image to have a specific role and place in the photograph. "Lipps doesn't shy away from including images with abrupt rectangular edges, choosing instead to retain these reminders of the material's original place on the page."

This exhibition displays Lipps' work as archival, as he sifts through photographic history, creating new visual relationships. In an interview, Lipps stated that in Library, the "content had shifted towards history itself, specifically our collective, shared relationship to history and memory experienced through the apparatus of photography."

=== HORIZON/S (2010) ===
With images taken from the popular 1950s American arts and sculpture magazine, Horizon, HORIZON/S acts as an archive of visual culture. These large diorama style groupings of modernist icons are set against bright yet minimal backdrops. Lipps uses acid lights to create colored shadows behind the cut-out figures, creating a lifelike and 3-dimensional aspect to Lipps's work. HORIZON/S is a "cerebral [investigation of context], mining the perceptions and strategies of Anthropology and Art History."

== Solo exhibitions ==
- AnObjectAnImage, Klemm's, Berlin, Germany, 2017
- Looking Through Pictures, Marc Selwyn Fine Arts, Los Angeles, CA, 2016
- Library, Danziger Gallery, New York, NY, 2015
- Figures, Art in General, New York, NY, 2015
- Special Problems, Josh Lilley Gallery, London, UK, 2014
- The Populist Camera, Jessica Silverman Gallery, San Francisco, CA, 2014
- Matt Lipps' Library, Marc Selwyn Fine Art, Los Angeles, CA, 2013
- HORIZON/S, University of California Riverside, Museum of Photography, CA, 2012
- Matt Lipps, Josh Lilley Gallery, London, UK, 2012
- HORIZON/S, Marc Selwyn Gallery, Los Angeles, CA, 2011
- HORIZON/S, Silverman Gallery, San Francisco, CA, 2011
- Untitled (Women's Heads), billboard project on La Cienega Blvd., LA><ART, Los Angeles, CA,
- Matt Lipps: HOME, Silverman Gallery, San Francisco, CA, 2010
- Horses, The Office, Huntington Beach, CA, 2008
- Cut, Harvey Levine Gallery, Project Room, Culver City, CA, 2006

== Collections ==
His works are held in the collections of:

- the Los Angeles County Museum of Art,
- the San Francisco Museum of Modern Art,
- the Museum of Contemporary Art, Los Angeles,
- the Hammer Museum (Los Angeles, CA),
- The Saatchi Gallery (London, UK), and
- the Pilara Foundation Collection at Pier 24 (San Francisco).
