= 1961 in the Vietnam War =

← 1960 1962 →
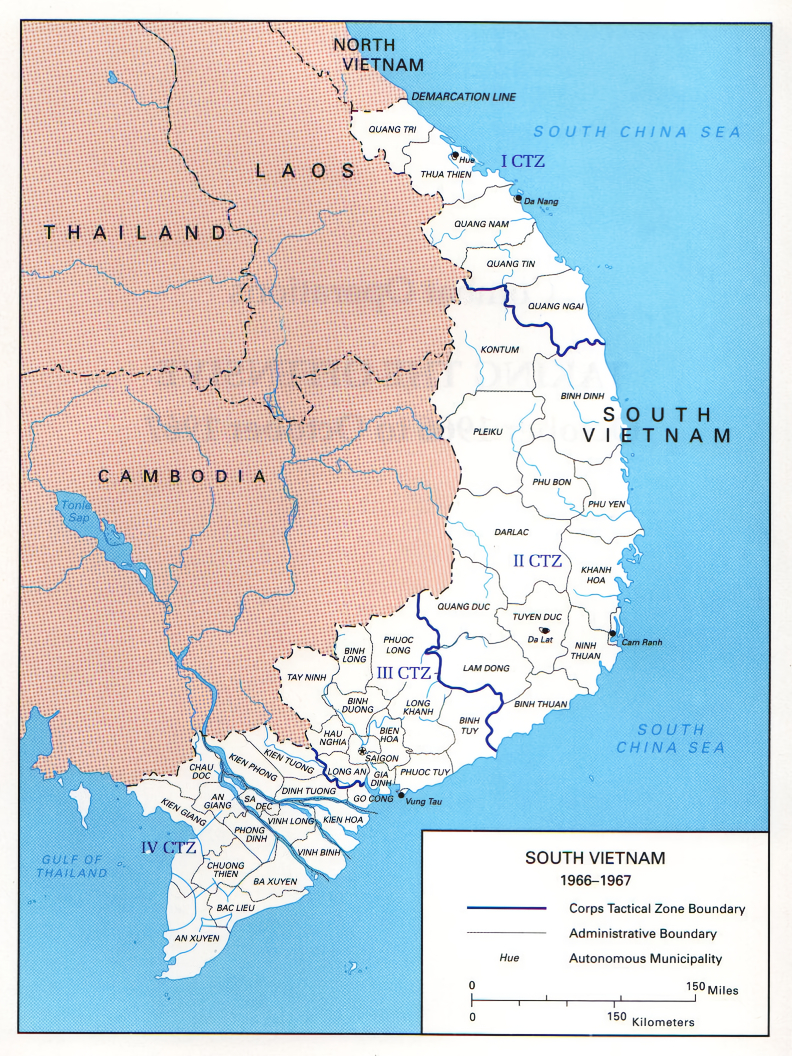
- A map of South Vietnam showing provincial boundaries and names and military zones: I, II, III and IV Corps.
| Location | Indochina |

Belligerents
| Anti-Communist forces: South Vietnam'; Kingdom of Laos (Taiwan) Republic of China | Communist forces: North Vietnam (Provisional Revolutionary Government of the Republic of South Vietnam) Viet Cong (Laos) Pathet Lao |

Strength
| South Vietnam 330,000. | |

Casualties and losses
| South Vietnam: 4,004 killed | Unknown |

The year 1961 saw a new American president, John F. Kennedy, attempt to cope with a deteriorating military and political situation in South Vietnam. The Viet Cong (VC) with assistance from North Vietnam made substantial gains in controlling much of the rural population of South Vietnam. Kennedy expanded military aid to the government of President Ngô Đình Diệm, increased the number of U.S. military advisors in South Vietnam, and reduced the pressure that had been exerted on Diệm during the Eisenhower Administration to reform his government and broaden his political base.

The year was marked by attempts of the United States Army to respond to Kennedy's emphasis on developing a greater capability in counterinsurgency, The U.S. Military Assistance Advisory Group (MAAG) began providing counterinsurgency training to the Army of the Republic of Vietnam (ARVN) and other security forces. The Kennedy Administration debated internally about introducing U.S. combat troops into South Vietnam, but Kennedy decided against ground soldiers. The Central Intelligence Agency (CIA) began assisting Montagnard irregular forces, American pilots began flying combat missions to support South Vietnamese ground forces, and Kennedy authorized the use of herbicides (Agent Orange) to kill vegetation near roads threatened by the VC. By the end of the year, 3,205 American military personnel were in South Vietnam compared to 900 a year earlier.

North Vietnam continued to urge the VC to be cautious in South Vietnam and emphasized the importance of the political struggle against the governments of Diệm and the United States rather than the military struggle.

== January ==
4 January

United States Ambassador to South Vietnam Elbridge Durbrow forwarded a counterinsurgency plan for South Vietnam to the State Department in Washington. The plan provided for an increase in the size of the ARVN from 150,000 to 170,000 to be financed by the United States, an increase in the size of the Civil Guard from about 50,000 to 68,000 to be partially financed by the United States and a number of administrative and economic reforms to be accomplished by the Diệm government.

The counterinsurgency plan was a "tacit recognition that the American effort...to create an [South Vietnamese] army that could provide stability and internal security...had failed.

6 January

Soviet Premier Nikita Khrushchev announced that the Soviet Union would support Wars of national liberation around the world.

14 January

Counterinsurgency expert and Diệm friend General Edward Lansdale returned to Washington after a 12-day visit to South Vietnam. Diệm had requested the Lansdale visit. Lansdale concluded that the U.S. should "recognize that Vietnam is in a critical condition and...treat it as a combat area of the cold war" Lansdale pushed for Durbrow to be replaced. He called for a major American effort to regain the initiative, including a team of advisers to work with Diệm to influence him to undertake reforms.

17 January - 30 September 1974

Operation Momentum was a secretive Central Intelligence Agency (CIA) program to raise a guerilla army from the Hmong tribes in Laos.

19 January

In a meeting between outgoing President Eisenhower and President-elect Kennedy, Eisenhower did not mention Vietnam as one of the major problems facing the U.S. Eisenhower described Laos as the "key to Southeast Asia."

20 January

Kennedy was inaugurated as the 35th U.S. president and declared, "...we shall pay any price, bear any burden, meet any hardship, support any friend, oppose any foe, to ensure the survival and the success of liberty."

21 January

Lansdale wrote to Secretary of Defense designate Robert McNamara about his recent visit to South Vietnam. "It was a shock," said Lansdale, to find that the VC "had been able to infiltrate the most productive area of South Vietnam and gain control of nearly all of it except for narrow corridors protected by military actions."

24 January

The Politburo in North Vietnam assessed the situation of the VC in South Vietnam. In the Central Highlands the VC were making progress with good support from rural people and the ethnic minority Degar or Montagnards. In the Mekong Delta, however, the situation was less favorable due to the easy access to those areas by the South Vietnamese government. The revolutionary message in the cities was "narrow and weak" as rural cadres and urban dwellers mistrusted each other. The Politburo mandated that the VC concentrate on political struggle in the South and "avoid military adventurism." They were to prepare for war—but the time for protracted conflict had not yet arrived.

The Politburo also created the Central Office for South Vietnam (COSVN) to coordinate military and political activity in South Vietnam. The U.S. would later devote much military effort to finding and destroying the Communist "Pentagon", but COSVN was always a mobile and widely dispersed organization and never a fixed place.

28 January

Kennedy met with his national security team for the first time. He approved the counterinsurgency plan proposed by the U.S. Embassy and authorized the additional funding needed to implement it. The plan called for increasing the size of the ARVN from 150,000 to 170,000 men.

Lansdale gave Kennedy a pessimistic report on the situation in South Vietnam. Kennedy proposed that Lansdale be named Ambassador to South Vietnam, but the Department of State and CIA successfully opposed the nomination. Lansdale was "not a team player" and "too independent."

30 January

Military Assistance Advisory Group (MAAG) chief General Lionel C. McGarr said that Diệm had done "a remarkably fine job during his five years in office and negative statements about him were half truths and insinuations. U.S. policy should be to support Diệm, not reform his government."

To the contrary, Ambassador Durbrow recommended that Secretary of State Dean Rusk press Diệm to reform his government and threaten to withhold aid if he refused.

31 January - 6 June

In the Battle of Ban Pa Dong the People's Army of Vietnam (PAVN) and Pathet Lao attacked Hmong forces of the Royal Lao Army forcing their dispersal.

== February ==
The military force of the VC, the People's Liberation Armed Forces (PLAF) was formed under the leadership of Tran Luong. Prior to this there had been no overall military command of the VC and the other groups united under the umbrella of the National Liberation Front.

13 February

Durbrow urged on Diệm a number of specific reforms in accordance with the counterinsurgency plan which conditioned U.S. military and economic aid on reforms in Diệm's government. Contrary to Durbrow, MAAG chief McGarr expressed the view, supported by Lansdale and Rusk, that the Department of Defense (DOD) should oppose conditioning U.S. aid on reform.

== March ==
1 March

Rusk told the Embassy that Kennedy "ranks the defense of Vietnam among the highest priorities of U.S. foreign policy." He said that Kennedy was worried that the Diệm government would not survive the two years it would take to implement the reforms called for in the counterinsurgency plan.

From this date U.S. military personnel are eligible to be awarded the Vietnam Campaign Medal with 1960 Device for service in South Vietnam.

13 March - August 1961

Operation Millpond was the deployment of U.S. air assets to Thailand for use in Laos, however the intervention was cancelled and the units eventually withdrawn.

23 March

A USAF C-47 flying from Vientiane to Saigon was shot down by Pathet Lao anti-aircraft gunners over the Plain of Jars in Laos. Six crewmen were killed and one was captured. The U.S. decided that henceforth all aircraft operating over Laos would bear Laotian identification markings.

28 March

Kennedy was briefed by the intelligence agencies about the deteriorating situation in South Vietnam. This was the first time that a National Intelligence Estimate expressed doubt about Diệm's ability to deal with the insurgency. Kennedy decided to send 100 additional military advisers to South Vietnam. Kennedy had pointed out the importance of counterinsurgency since the first days of his presidency. In a speech to Congress, he said the United States needed "a greater ability to deal with guerrilla forces, insurrections, and subversion." He followed up his speech with proposals to expand the budget and military forces for unconventional war.

== April ==
1 April

The VC launched simultaneous attacks against two ARVN positions: one within Kien Hoa Province, and the other at Ben Cat north of Saigon. Both attacks were repulsed by ARVN troops, with the VC losing 100 men.

9 April

Diệm was re-elected President of South Vietnam with nearly 80 percent of the votes. The VC attempted to disrupt the election in rural areas.

13 April

Robert Grainger Ker Thompson, a British counterinsurgency expert who had helped the British defeat a communist insurgency in Malaya, visited South Vietnam at the invitation of Diệm and presented a report to Diệm recommending a Strategic Hamlet Program to defeat the VC. Thompson would be an important adviser to the South Vietnamese government throughout the war, but had only a limited influence on the Kennedy and Johnson Administrations.

mid April

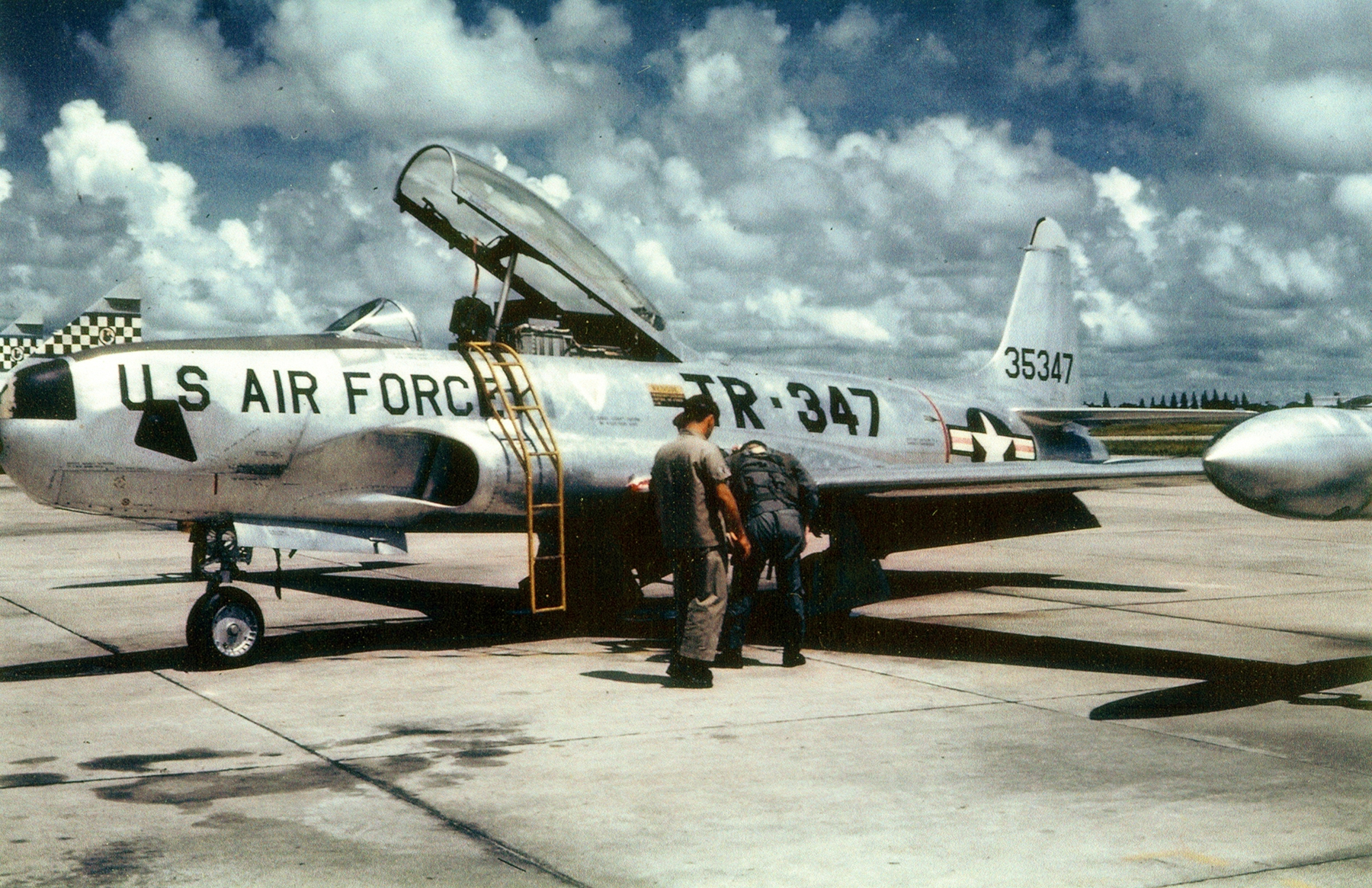
Operation Field Goal RT-33

An advance party of the USAF 6010th Tactical Group arrived at Don Muang Royal Thai Air Force Base at the request of the Thai government to establish an aircraft warning system. On 20 April six F-100 Super Sabres from the 510th Tactical Fighter Squadron based at Clark Air Base deployed to Don Muang in Operation Bell Tone. On 17 April USAF pilots began flying an RT-33 on reconnaissance missions over Laos under the code-name Operation Field Goal.

27 April

The report of a high-level study group headed by Undersecretary of Defense Roswell Gilpatric said that "South Vietnam is nearing the decisive phase of its battle for survival" and that the situation is "critical but not hopeless." It recommended that the United States show "our friends, the Vietnamese, and our foes, the Viet Cong, that come what may, the US intends to win this battle."

== May ==
2 May

A ceasefire was declared in Laos between the Pathet Lao and government troops. Kennedy had contemplated American military intervention in Laos, but the ceasefire damped down tensions between the U.S. and the Soviet Union supporting different Laotian factions.

4 May

During a press conference, Rusk stated that the VC were estimated to number over 12,000, and that the United States would provide South Vietnam with "all possible help". However, he did not state if American troops would be dispatched to South Vietnam.

5 May

At a press conference, a reporter asked Kennedy if he was considering the introduction of American combat troops into South Vietnam. Kennedy said he was concerned about the "barrage" faced by the government of South Vietnam from VC guerrillas and that the introduction of troops and other help was under consideration.

6 May

The Chairman of the Joint Chiefs of Staff General Lyman Lemnitzer told MAAG chief McGarr that "Kennedy was ready to do anything within reason to save Southeast Asia." Lemnitzer opined that "marginal and piecemeal efforts" would not save South Vietnam from a communist victory.

10 May

Frederick Nolting, a career diplomat, arrived in Saigon to replace Durbrow as U.S. Ambassador. Nolting interpreted his instructions as primarily to improve relations with Diệm, strained by Durbrow's hectoring Diệm to make social and economic reforms. Nolting would try to influence Diệm by agreeing with him and supporting him unconditionally. Prior to this date, Nolting had never set foot in Asia.

11 May

Vice President Lyndon Johnson arrived in South Vietnam for a three-day visit. Johnson's instructions were to "get across to President Diệm our confidence in him as a man of great stature." Johnson called Diệm "the Winston Churchill of Southeast Asia." Johnson also delivered a letter from Kennedy which approved an increase in the ARVN from 150,000 to 170,000 soldiers and said that the United States "was prepared to consider a further increase." In a significant change from the policy of Durbrow and the Eisenhower Administration, U.S. funding for the increase in military aid was not conditioned on the Diệm government undertaking social and economic reforms. Diệm, however, declined Kennedy's offer to introduce American combat troops into South Vietnam saying that it would be a propaganda victory for the VC.

On his return to Washington, Johnson noted the disaffection of the Vietnamese people with Diệm but concluded that the "existing government in Saigon is the only realistic alternative to Viet Minh [VC] control."

Kennedy issued National Security Action Memorandum - 52 which called for a study of increasing the ARVN from 170,000 to 200,000; expanded MAAG responsibilities to include aid to the Civil Guard and Self Defense Corps; authorized sending 400 Special Forces soldiers to South Vietnam covertly to train ARVN; approved covert and intelligence operations in both North and South Vietnam; and proposed actions to improve relations between Diem and the U.S.

13 May

A 92-man unit of the Army Security Agency, operating under cover of the 3rd Radio Research Unit (3rd RRU), arrived at Tan Son Nhut Air Base and established a communications intelligence facility in disused Republic of Vietnam Air Force (RVNAF) warehouses on the base (10.81°N 106.649°E). This was the first full deployment of a U.S. Army unit to South Vietnam.

16 May

The International Conference on the Settlement of the Laotian Question convened in Geneva, Switzerland at the behest of Cambodian leader Prince Norodom Sihanouk. The objective of the meeting was to create a neutralist Laos free from superpower rivalries and to reach an amicable end to a civil war. North Vietnam, South Vietnam, the Soviet Union and the United States were among the countries participating in the conference. North Vietnam supported the concept of a neutral Laos.

== June ==
4 June

Kennedy and Khrushchev met in Vienna, Austria and expressed support for an international agreement to create a neutral and independent Laos.

9 June

Diệm requested that the U.S. subsidize an increase in the ARVN from 170,000 to 270,000. The U.S. approved financing an increase of only 30,000 personnel.

12 June

Chinese Premier Zhou Enlai and North Vietnamese Premier Phạm Văn Đồng in Beijing accused the United States of "aggression and intervention in South Vietnam."

== July ==
1 July

General Maxwell Taylor was appointed by Kennedy as the "President's Military Representative." Taylor, a retired General returned to duty by Kennedy, was already a key adviser on Vietnam and military issues.

3 July

The U.S. Department of Defense recommended an increase in the ARVN from 170,000 to 200,000.

16 July

Nolting recommended to Washington that U.S. aid to South Vietnam be increased to finance the expansion of the ARVN, cover a balance of payments deficit, and assure Diệm of the seriousness of the U.S. commitment to his government.

== August ==
Journalist Theodore White wrote a letter to Kennedy about his visit to South Vietnam: "the situation gets steadily worse almost week by week....Guerrillas now control almost all the Southern delta - so much that I could find no American who would drive me outside Saigon in his car even by day without military convoy...What perplexes the hell out of me is that the Commies, on their side, seem able to find people willing to die for their cause."

1 August

The French diplomatic mission in Haiphong reported widespread dissatisfaction with the North Vietnamese government. Austerity measures and reduced food rations were alienating even the "spouses of the highest ranking personalities in the Regime."

10 August

For the first time the United States used herbicides in the war. U.S. airplanes sprayed herbicides on forests near Dak To.

== September ==
1 September

Two battalions (approximately 1,000 men) of communist troops who had recently infiltrated South Vietnam from Laos, overran Kon Tum, capital of Kontum Province. The communists repelled a rescue effort by ARVN and Civil Guards on 3 September and faded into the jungle before two battalions of ARVN arrived on 4 September.

15 September

MAAG issued its "Geographically Phased National Level Operation Plan for Counterinsurgency" plan which envisioned the pacification of South Vietnam by the end of 1964. The first step proposed in the plan was a sweep by ARVN through the VC dominated War Zone D, a forested area 50 miles (80 km) northeast of Saigon. The South Vietnamese government did not execute the plan, favoring instead an alternative, and much less detailed, plan advanced by British counterinsurgency expert Robert Thompson.

17-18 September

The VC overrun Phước Thành 55 miles (89 km) north of Saigon. They held a "people's trial" of the province chief and his deputy and then beheaded both men in the town square.

21 September

The 5th Special Forces Group was activated at Fort Bragg, it would see extensive service in the war.

30 September

The United Kingdom established the British Advisory Mission (BRIAM) in Saigon under Thompson. BRIAM would advise Diệm on counterinsurgency strategy and function as an alternative to MAAG.

== October ==
2 October

Speaking to the National Assembly, Diệm said that "it is no longer a guerrilla war but one waged by an enemy who attacks us with regular units fully and heavily equipped and seeks a decision in Southeast Asia in conformity with the orders of the Communist International.

3 October

David A. Nuttle, an International Voluntary Services employee, met with CIA Station Chief William Colby. Tuttle worked with the Rhade people, one of the Montagnard ethnic groups of Darlac province in the Central Highlands about 150 miles (240 km) northeast of Saigon. Colby asked Nuttle to help "create a pilot model of a Montagnard defended village." The CIA and U.S. military were looking for means to combat the growing influence of the VC in the Central Highlands. Nuttle rejected the proposed strategy of the South Vietnamese government and MAAG of putting the Montagnards on "reservations" and making the remainder of the Central Highlands a free fire zone. Instead he said that, while the Rhade would not fight for South Vietnam, they would defend their villages and thereby resist VC control. The CIA decided to initiate a pilot project to implement Tuttle's ideas.

6 October

Nolting sent the following message to Washington: "Two of my closest colleagues [Embassy officers Joseph Mendenhall and Arthur Gardiner] believe that this country cannot attain the required unity, total national dedication, and organizational efficiency necessary to win with Diệm at helm. This may be true. Diệm does not organize well, does not delegate sufficient responsibility to his subordinates and does not appear to know how to cultivate large-scale political support. In my judgment, he is right and sound in his objectives and completely forthright with us. I think it would be a mistake to seek an alternative to Diệm at this time or in the foreseeable future. Our present policy of all-out support to the present government here is, I think, our only feasible alternative."

11 October

The Joint Chiefs of Staff presented Kennedy with a report stating that the defeat of the VC would require 40,000 U.S. combat troops, plus another 120,000 to guard the borders to deal with threats of invasion or infiltration by North Vietnam or China.

13 October

General Richard G. Stilwell, submitted a report to the Secretary of the Army and Army Chief of Staff stating that the efforts of the Army to develop counterinsurgency strategy had been a "failure to evolve simple and dynamic doctrine. The report called for the whole Army to take on counterinsurgency as its mission rather than relegating it to Special Forces

18 October

Taylor arrived in Saigon as head of a mission sent by Kennedy to examine the feasibility of U.S. military intervention in Vietnam. Deputy National Security Adviser Walter Rostow and Lansdale, were among the members of his delegation. In their report written after the trip, Taylor proposed a new partnership between South Vietnam and the U.S. that would involve dispatching 8,000 to 10,000 American soldiers to South Vietnam. These soldiers would permit joint planning of military operations, improved intelligence, increased covert activities, more American advisers, trainers, and special forces and the introduction of American helicopter and light aircraft squadrons. Most significantly, they would also "conduct such combat operations as are necessary for self-defense and for the security of the area in which they are stationed."

During the Taylor visit Diệm met privately with Lansdale and later requested that he be assigned to South Vietnam. Instead, Kennedy gave Lansdale the job of attempting to depose or kill Cuban leader Fidel Castro. According to Rostow, the failure to send Lansdale to South Vietnam was due to jealousy by the State Department and the Defense Department of Lansdale's unique access and influence with Diệm.

26 October

North Vietnam's two-track approach, building socialism in the North while providing limited support to the VC in the South, was criticized by members of the National Assembly in Hanoi who gave a bleak view of the prospects for the revolution in South Vietnam. Increased American aid had increased the ability of the Diệm government to oppress its people and to inflict damage on the VC. They derided the assistance the North had provided to the VC. One Assemblyman, to make the point about oppression in the South, cited statistics gathered by the National Liberation Front that the Diệm government had killed 77,500 people between 1954 and 1960 and imprisoned 270,000 political dissidents.

== November ==
2 November

Senator Mike Mansfield, formerly a strong supporter of Diệm, took exception to Taylor's report. He told Kennedy to be cautious when contemplating American combat soldiers in Vietnam. Mansfield said, "we cannot hope to substitute armed power for the kind of political and economic social changes that offer the best resistance to communism." If reforms had not been achieved in South Vietnam in the previous several years, "I do not see how American combat troops can do it today."

4 November

According to his own account of a Washington meeting, State Department official George Ball warned Taylor and McNamara that introducing 8,000 or more American soldiers into South Vietnam might cause "a protracted conflict far more serious than Korea....The Vietnam problem was not one of repelling overt invasion but of mixing ourselves up in a revolutionary situation with strong anti-colonialist overtones." Three other State Department officials also expressed their opposition to the introduction of American combat soldiers: Averell Harriman, Chester Bowles and John Kenneth Galbraith. Rusk had reservations because Diệm was "a losing horse."

The Rhade people of Buon Enao, a village of 400 people 6 miles (9.7 km) from the city of Ban Me Thout, made an agreement with the ARVN and the CIA to serve as a model village to be defended against the VC. The Rhade conditions were that all ARVN attacks against their villages and their neighbors, the Jarai, would cease, amnesty would be given to all Rhade who had helped the VC and the government would provide medical, educational, and agricultural assistance. Buon Enao, in exchange, would create a self-defense force, initially armed only with crossbows and spears and fortify the village. If proven successful, the Buon Enao model would be replicated elsewhere in the Central Highlands which constituted most of South Vietnam's area, although had only a small share of its population. This was the beginning of the Civilian Irregular Defense Group program (CIDG).

10 November

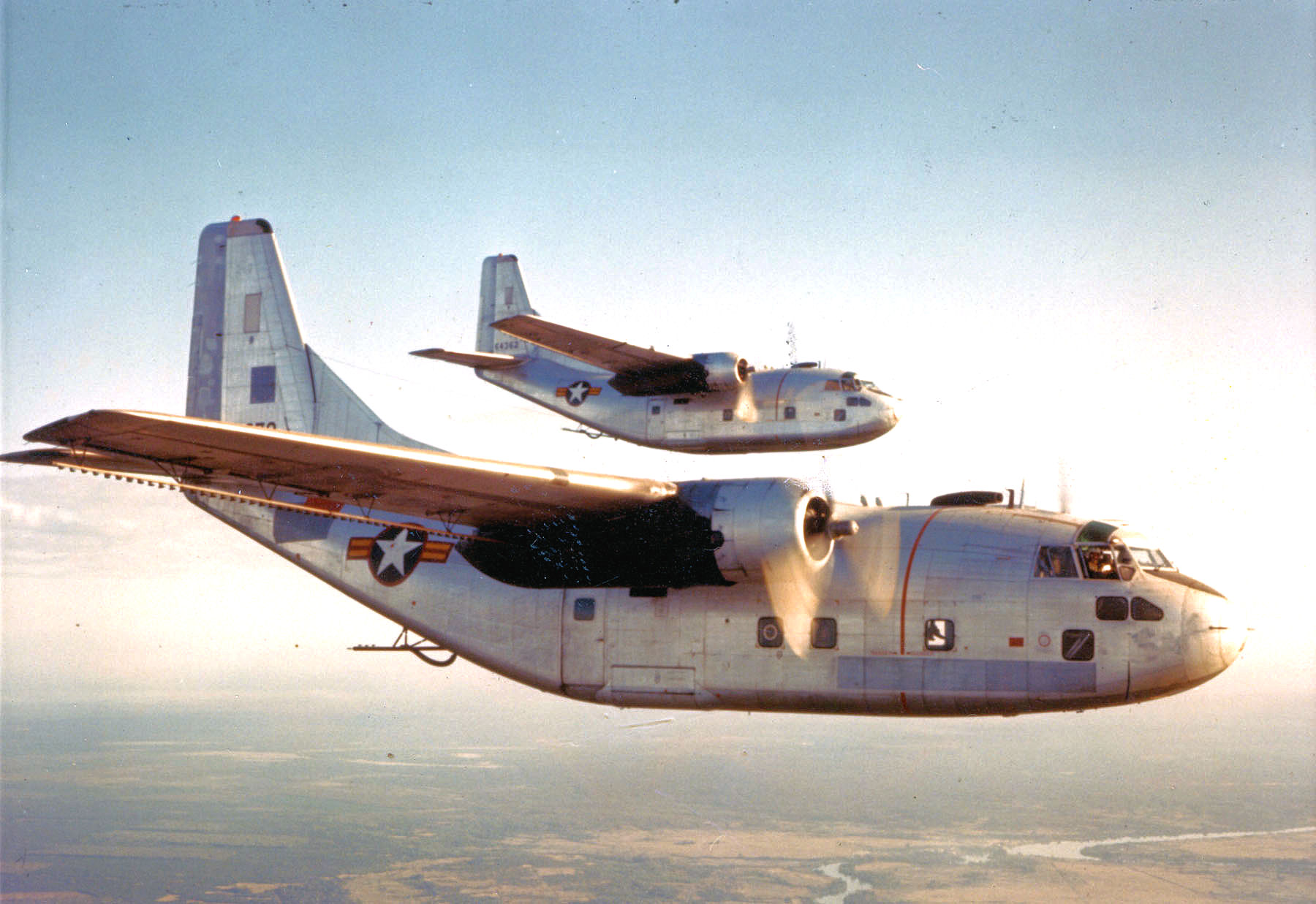
Ranch Hand C-123s.

Kennedy approved a "selective and carefully controlled joint program of defoliant operations" in Vietnam. The initial use of herbicides was to be for clearance of key land routes, but might proceed to the use of herbicides to kill food crops. This was the beginning of Operation Ranch Hand which would defoliate much of South Vietnam during the next decade.

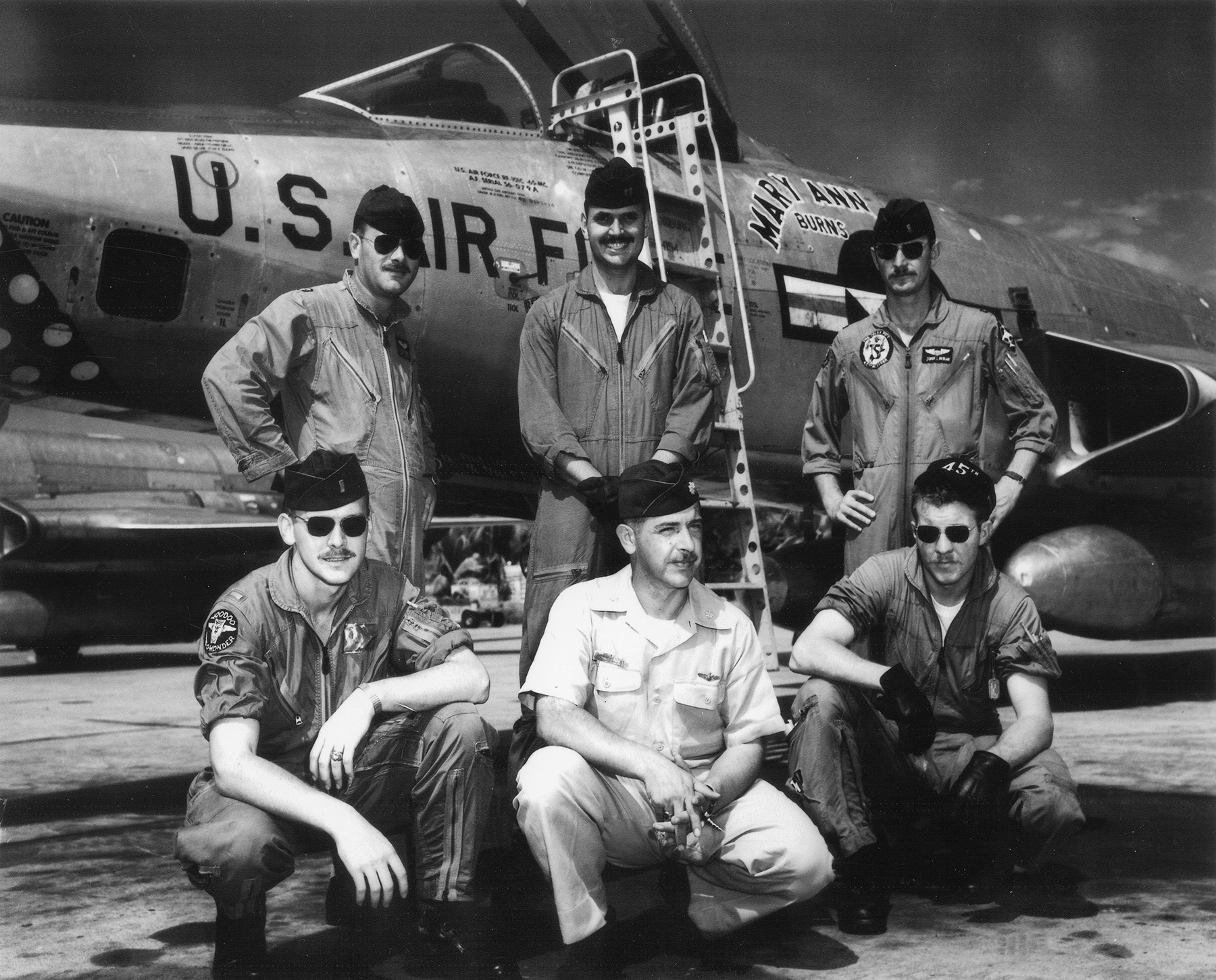
Operation Able Marble crews in front of an RF-101C

Four RF-101C reconnaissance aircraft of the 45th Tactical Reconnaissance Squadron stationed at Misawa AB, Japan, and their photo lab arrived at Don Muang Royal Thai Air Force Base under Operation Able Marble. The RF-101s were sent to replace the RT-33 aircraft in performing aerial reconnaissance flights over Laos.

11 November

Thompson presented his plan for pacifying the Mekong Delta to Diệm. The essence of the plan was to win the loyalties of the rural people in the Delta rather than kill VC. Instead of search and destroy military sweeps by large ARVN forces, Thompson proposed "clear and hold" actions. Protection of the villages and villages was an ongoing process, not an occasional military sweep. The means of protecting the villages would be "strategic hamlets", lightly fortified villages in low risk areas. In more insecure areas, especially along the Cambodian border, villages would be more heavily defended or the rural dwellers relocated.

The British plan and the preference shown it by Diệm caused consternation at MAAG and with its chief, McGarr. Much of the British plan was contrary to American counterinsurgency plans. However, in Washington many State Department and White House officials received the British plan favorably. Many questioned the view of the DOD that conventional military forces and tactics would defeat the VC.

15 November

At a meeting of the National Security Council Kennedy expressed doubts about the wisdom of introducing combat soldiers into South Vietnam.

16 November

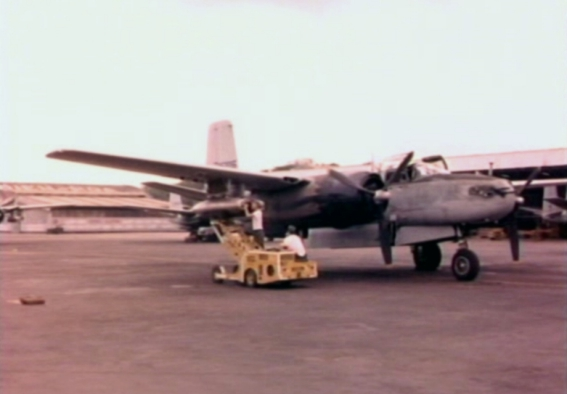
Farm Gate B-26 at Bien Hoa Air Base

Anticipating that Kennedy would soon decide to dispatch American combat soldiers to South Vietnam, "Farm Gate" American aircraft began arriving in South Vietnam. The "Jungle Jim" 1st Air Commando Group was to train the RVNAF using older aircraft. Air Commandos would have a "second mission of combat operations."

22 November

Kennedy approved National Security Action Memorandum, No. 111 which authorized the U.S. to provide additional equipment and support to South Vietnam, including helicopters and aircraft, to train the South Vietnamese Civil Guard and Self-Defense Corps and to assist the South Vietnamese military in a number of areas, plus providing economic assistance to the government. The NSAM also called for South Vietnam to improve its military establishment and mobilize its resources to prosecute the war. Thus, Kennedy stopped short of what many of his advisers, including Taylor, had advised: the introduction of U.S. combat soldiers into South Vietnam. Kennedy's decision not to introduce combat troops surprised the DOD which had been assembling forces to be assigned to South Vietnam, including Farm Gate aircraft. However, Kennedy's decision was a visible and undeniable violation of the Geneva Accords of 1954, still technically in force.

Kennedy approved the use of herbicides in South Vietnam to kill vegetation along roads and to destroy crops being grown to feed the VC. The herbicide most used would become known as Agent Orange.

27 November

At a White House meeting of top officials, Kennedy complained about the lack of "whole-hearted support" for his policies and demanded to know who at the DOD was responsible in Washington for his Vietnam program. McNamara said he would be responsible. Kennedy also demanded that Nolting in Saigon press Diệm to take action to reform his government.

30 November

Kennedy called a meeting of the U.S. Army's top commanders. He expressed disappointment that the army had not moved more quickly to implement his counterinsurgency proposals, saying, "I want you guys to get with it. I know that the Army is not going to develop in this counterinsurgency field and do the things that I think must be done unless the Army itself wants to do it." He followed the meeting up with a memo to McNamara saying he was "not satisfied that the Department of Defense, and in particular the Army, is according the necessary degree of attention and effort to the threat of insurgency and guerrilla war."

== December ==
1 December

According to French reports from their diplomatic mission in Hanoi, several revolts by peasants and minority groups had been ruthlessly repressed during the previous several months by the PAVN and challenges to the government had become rare.

4 December

A dozen U.S. Army Special Forces soldiers arrived in Buon Enao to begin the CIDG project. ARVN Special Forces were already in the village building a dispensary and a fence around the village, and training a 30-man self-defense force. The CIA provided rifles and sub-machine guns to the self-defense force. The Buon Enao experiment was a holistic approach to the threat of the insurgency, relying on social and economic programs as well as military measures to create an anti-communist movement among the Montagnard people who traditionally mistrusted Vietnamese of all political persuasions.

The Armed Forces Expeditionary Medal was authorized for award to U.S. military personnel serving in South Vietnam from 1 July 1958 and Laos from 19 April 1961.

5 December

USAF General Curtis LeMay urged the Joint Chiefs of Staff to try to persuade Kennedy to approve the introduction of substantial combat forces into South Vietnam.

11 December

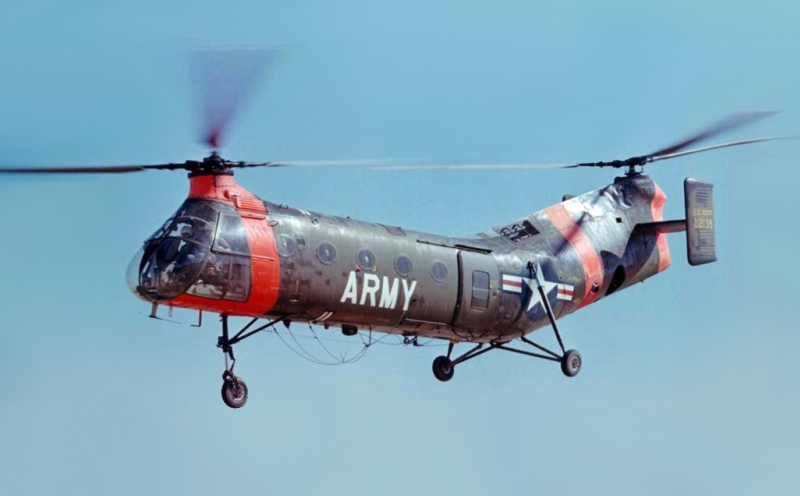
CH-21 Shawnee

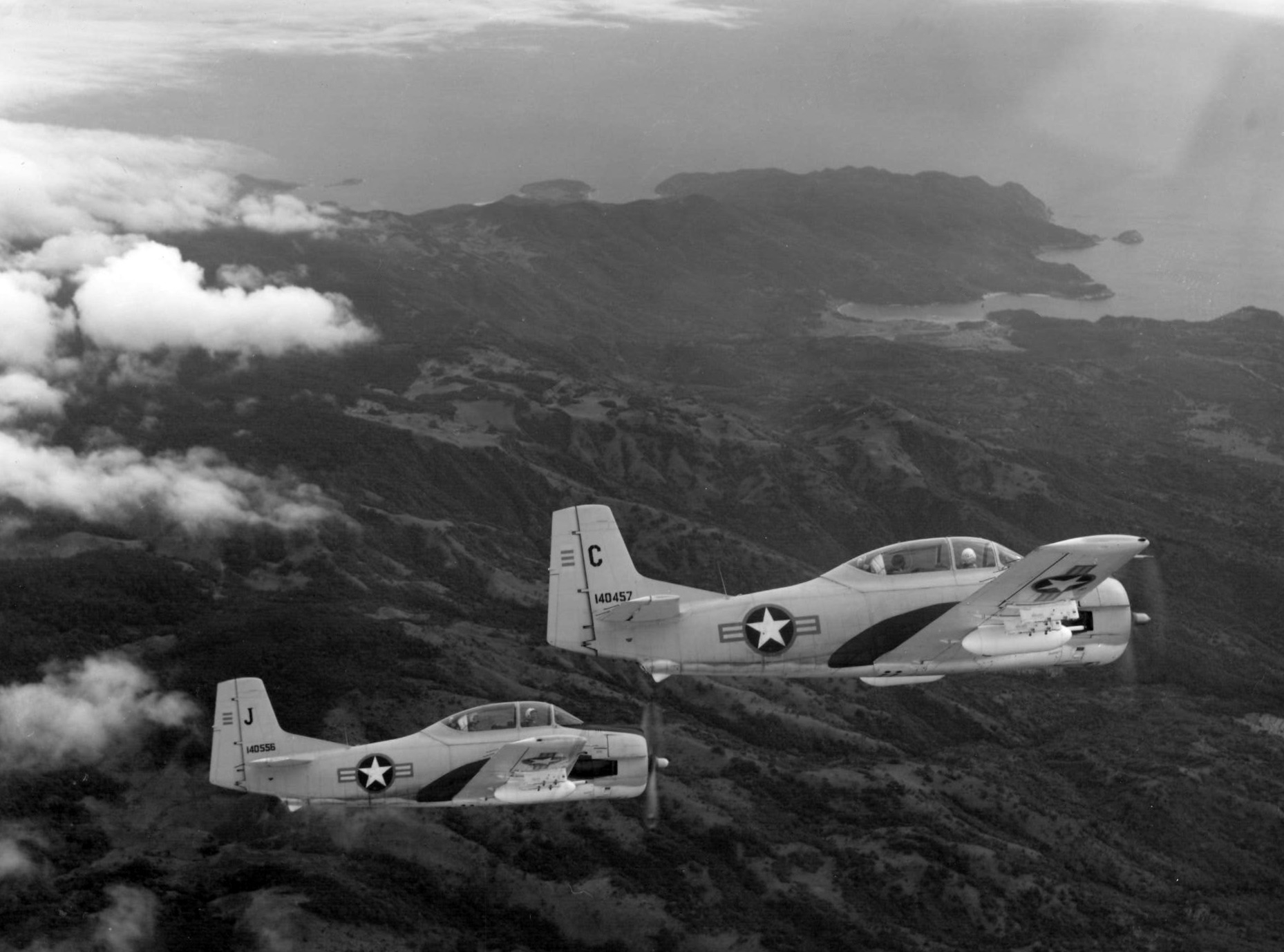
RVNAF T-28 Trojans

The USS Core docked in Saigon carrying 32 CH-21 Shawnee 20-passenger helicopters, four single-engine training planes and about 400 U.S. crewmen of the 8th and 57th Transportation Companies (Helicopter Light), the first U.S. Army helicopter units to deploy to South Vietnam. In addition 15 T-28C Trojans were provided to the RVNAF.

13 December - 10 September 1962

Operation Pincushion was a covert U.S. Special Forces program to train hill tribes in southern Laos to become guerilla fighters for the Royal Lao Army.

16 December

McNamara met with senior U.S. military leaders in Hawaii to discuss the implementation of the expanded military aid to South Vietnam. He listed three tenets: (1) We have great authority from the President; (2) Money is no object; and (3) The one restriction is that combat troops will not be introduced. In closing the meeting McNamara said the job of the U.S. military "was to win in South Viet Nam and if we weren't winning to tell him what was needed to win."

American pilots were granted permission to fly combat missions, but only if a South Vietnamese national was aboard.

19 December

The first Operation Farm Gate combat training sorties commenced.

21 December

Cryptologist SP4 James T. Davis of the United States Army Security Agency's 3rd Radio Research Unit was operating a mobile PRD-1 receiver with an ARVN unit near Cầu Xáng when they were ambushed by VC and Davis was killed, becoming one of the first Americans killed in ground combat.

23 December

Operation Chopper was the first combat operation for United States Army soldiers in Vietnam. U.S. pilots transported about 1,000 Army of the Republic of Vietnam (ARVN) paratroopers by helicopter to land and attack VC guerrillas about 10 miles (16 km) west of Saigon. The operation was deemed a success. Chopper heralded a new era of air mobility for the U.S. Army, which had been growing as a concept since the Army formed twelve helicopter battalions in 1952 during the Korean War. U.S. President John F. Kennedy said only that the U.S. was helping the ARVN with "training and transportation." He declined to offer more details about Operation Chopper to avoid "assisting the enemy."

31 December

U.S. military personnel in South Vietnam numbered 3,205 compared to 900 at the end of 1960. Sixteen American soldiers were killed in South Vietnam in 1961 compared to nine in the previous five years. South Vietnamese military forces numbered almost 180,000 and police, militia, and paramilitary numbered 159,000. The South Vietnamese armed forces suffered 4,004 killed in action, nearly double the total killed in the previous year.

31 December

During 1961, North Vietnam infiltrated 6,300 persons, mostly southern communists who had migrated to North Vietnam in 1954-1955 and 317 tons of arms and equipment into South Vietnam. There were approximately 35,000 communist party members in South Vietnam. The VC were estimated by the United States to control 20 percent of the 15 million people in South Vietnam and influence 40 percent. In the rice-growing Mekong Delta, the VC were believed to control seven of the 13 provinces.
