= 1959 in the Vietnam War =

← 1958 1960 →
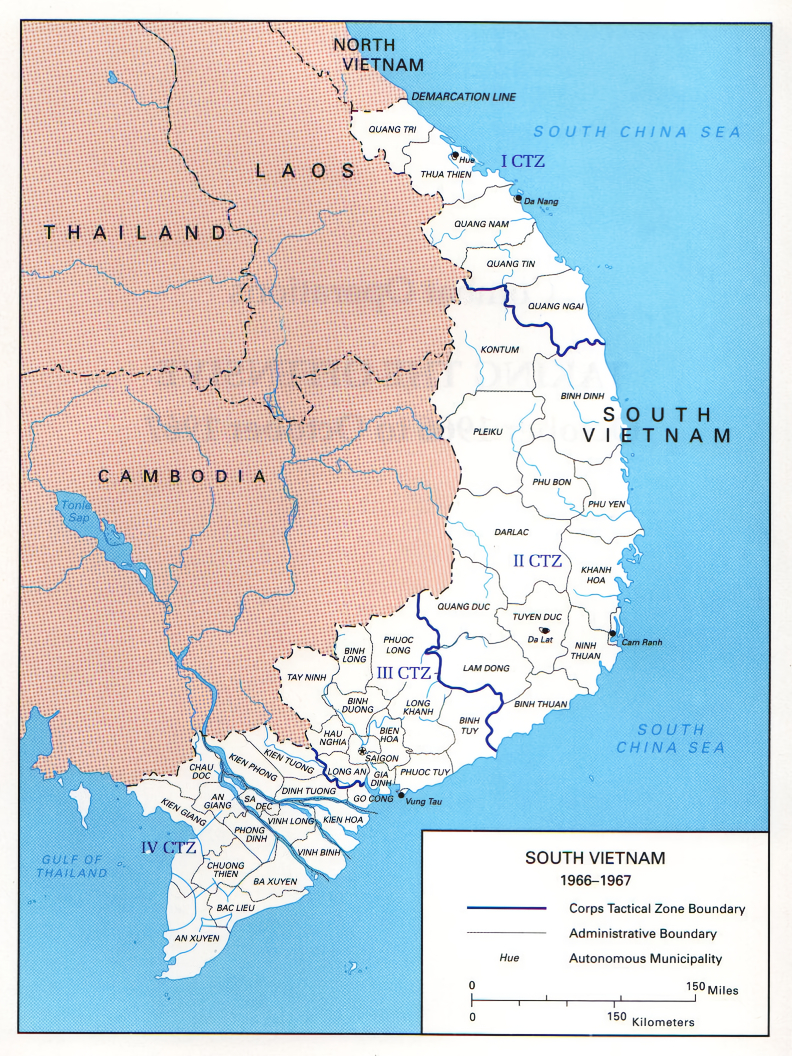
- A map of South Vietnam showing provincial boundaries and names and military zones (I, II, III, and IV Corps).
Location	Indochina

Belligerents
Anti-Communist forces: South Vietnam; United States; Kingdom of Laos	Communist forces: North Vietnam; Anti-government insurgents (Laos) Pathet Lao

Strength
US: 760	5,000

Casualties and losses
US: 4 killed from 1956–1959; South Vietnam: 138 killed	Unknown

1959 saw Vietnam still divided into South (ruled by President Ngô Đình Diệm) and North (led by communist Ho Chi Minh). North Vietnam authorized the Viet Cong (VC) to undertake limited military action as well as political action to subvert the Diệm government. North Vietnam also authorized the construction of what would become known as the Ho Chi Minh Trail to supply the VC in South Vietnam. Armed encounters between the VC and the government of South Vietnam became more frequent and with larger numbers involved. In September, 360 soldiers of the Army of the Republic of Vietnam (ARVN) were ambushed by a force of about 100 VC guerrillas.

In August an election chose the members of South Vietnam's National Assembly. The election was marred by intimidation and fraud by Diệm's party which won the majority of seats. Diệm's most prominent critic, Phan Quang Đán, was elected but was prevented from serving in the Assembly.

Diệm began the year seeming to be firmly in control of South Vietnam, but VC military successes began to impact his government by the end of the year.

== January ==
Summing up President Ngô Đình Diệm's accomplishments over the preceding several years, a United States Army historian said, "Bolstered by some $190 million a year in American military and economic aid, Diệm enforced at least a degree of governmental authority throughout South Vietnam. His regime resettled the refugees, achieved a measure of economic prosperity, and promulgated what was, on paper, a progressive land reform policy. By means of a series of harsh and indiscriminate but effective anti-Communist 'denunciation' campaigns, Diệm made progress in destroying the remaining Viet Minh organization in the countryside. His troops kept the surviving sect and Communist guerrillas on the run, and his government attempted to establish mass organizations of its own to control and indoctrinate the people."

The CIA intercepted a message from Hanoi ordering the establishment of two bases to carry out guerilla warfare operations: one within the western Central Highlands, and another within Tay Ninh Province close to the Cambodian border.

1 January

The VC were estimated to number 5,000.

12 January

The Central Committee of the Communist Party of North Vietnam met in Hanoi to "discuss the situation inside the country since the signing of the Geneva Accords of 1954 and bring forward the revolutionary line for the entire country and the southern revolution." Lê Duẩn, General Secretary of the Party, who had recently returned from a clandestine visit to South Vietnam, spoke about the losses the VC had suffered as a result of the increasing aggressiveness of the Diệm Government aided by more than $965 million (about $6.7 billion in 2014 dollars) in U.S. assistance, mostly military, since 1955. Lê Duẩn proposed that it was time to complement the political struggle in South Vietnam with military action. The North Vietnamese communists were being accused by the VC of cowardice for not helping it in their struggle against Diệm.

22 January

Influenced by the reports of Lê Duẩn and others, the Central Committee of the Communist Party of North Vietnam adopted Resolution 15. The resolution sanctioned armed force to "end the plight of the poor and miserable people in the South" and "defeat each wicked policy of the American imperialists and their puppets." The content and adoption of Resolution 15 remained a closely held secret among senior Party members until details were worked out for its implementation.

Moderates, probably including Ho Chi Minh and General Võ Nguyên Giáp, were reluctant to support a revolutionary struggle in South Vietnam. However, Party members, in the words of one historian, were convinced that they "could no longer continue to advocate restraint without losing the control and allegiance of the southern communists as well as the reunification struggle with Diệm."

22 January-19 April 1961

Under Project Hotfoot United States Army Special Forces secretly began training the Royal Lao Army.

== March ==
A 45-man platoon of highland Montagnard tribesmen was formed in Quảng Ngãi Province, the first armed Communist military unit in the area since the end of the war with the French in 1954. The platoon awaited guidance from Hanoi before undertaking any armed actions.

2 March

United States Ambassador to South Vietnam Elbridge Durbrow met with President Diệm's brother, Ngô Đình Nhu, to urge him to curtail the repressive tactics of the Cần Lao organization, headed by Nhu, dominated by Catholics, and the only legal political party in South Vietnam. Nhu resisted the U.S. pressure. Durbrow concluding that Cần Lao's "undercover operations had so antagonized large sections of the population that an effort had to be made to greatly curtail the operations." Durbrow later brought up the subject with Diệm to no apparent effect.

== April ==
4 April

President of the United States Dwight D. Eisenhower refers to the "inescapable conclusion that U.S. interests are linked to those of South Vietnam."

== May ==
1 May

South Vietnam's Marine Corps launch their first operation attacking the VC in An Xuyên Province in the Mekong Delta.

6 May

In response to an increasing number of attacks by VC guerrillas, the National Assembly of South Vietnam adopted Law 10-59 authorizing military tribunals to impose death sentences on persons suspected of a wide variety of terrorist and destructive actions.

7 May

The Communist Party of North Vietnam finalized the policy for implementing Resolution 15 and communicated its guidelines to VC leaders in South Vietnam. The guidelines authorized "armed self defense" combined with "political struggle" but did not authorize a full-fledged war of national liberation. Political assassinations and small-scale guerrilla actions against the ARVN were authorized.

19 May

Communist Party leaders in Hanoi established the Special Military Operations Corps Group 559 to maintain a supply route from North to South Vietnam along the backbone of the Annamese Cordillera. Later, in September 1959, Group 959 was created to construct supply lines through Laos to South Vietnam and to provide military support to the Pathet Lao communist guerrillas. These decisions marked the beginning of the development of the north–south network of roads that would later be called the Ho Chi Minh Trail.

25 May

American advisers to the ARVN were authorized to accompany units on operational missions, "provided they do not become involved in actual combat." Previously American advisers had been prohibited from accompanying the ARVN on combat missions.

== June ==
North Vietnam infiltrated 4,000 People's Army of Vietnam (PAVN) troops into South Vietnam.

== July ==
7 July

President Diệm celebrated the fifth anniversary of his leadership of South Vietnam. Eisenhower congratulated Diệm for "the progress made by Viet-Nam in the years since you assumed leadership." The New York Times congratulated him for building a "constitutional democracy.' Four hundred prominent Americans, including Senator Mike Mansfield, Supreme Court Justice William O. Douglas and Catholic Cardinal Spellman sent a letter of congratulation to Diệm. Mansfield said that South Vietnam was "fortunate in having a man of Diệm's vision, strength, and selflessness as their leader."

President Diệm announced the creation of the Agroville Program. The Minister of Interior explained that the rural people of South Vietnam were "living in such spread out manner that the government cannot protect them and they are obliged to furnish supplies to the Viet Cong. Therefore, it is necessary to concentrate this population..." The objective of the Agroville program was to build fortified settlements in rural areas which could be protected by the ARVN and thereby to isolate the population from the VC.

8 July

Six VC guerrillas attacked a Military Assistance Advisory Group (MAAG) compound in Biên Hòa, a town about 20 miles (32 km) northeast of Saigon. Two U.S. soldiers (Dale R. Buis and Chester M. Ovnand) and three Vietnamese were killed by the guerrillas. Security for 2,000 American military and civilian officials working in South Vietnam was increased and MAAG personnel began carrying weapons.

20 July

Journalist Albert Colegrove published a series of newspaper articles that prompted an investigation of U.S. aid to the Diệm government. "The American aid program in little free Vietnam is an outrageous scandal", he said. "We have wasted many millions of dollars." The President of the pro-Diệm lobbying organization, American Friends of Vietnam, General John O'Daniel charged that "what the Communists failed to achieve in five years - to cast doubt on the Free Vietnamese and American aid program there - was accomplished in one week of headlines." Senator William Fulbright said that "these articles have done a great deal of damage...to our efforts in Vietnam."

28-31 July

PAVN forces attacked Royal Lao Army forces along the North Vietnam-Laos border.

30 July

General Samuel L. Myers, Deputy MAAG commander for South Vietnam, told a United States Senate committee hearing that the ARVN was "now able to maintain internal security and...should there be renewed aggression from the north they can give a really good account of themselves." The committee praised the MAAG group for its work but called the U.S. mission 'the weakest country team we have met."

== August ==
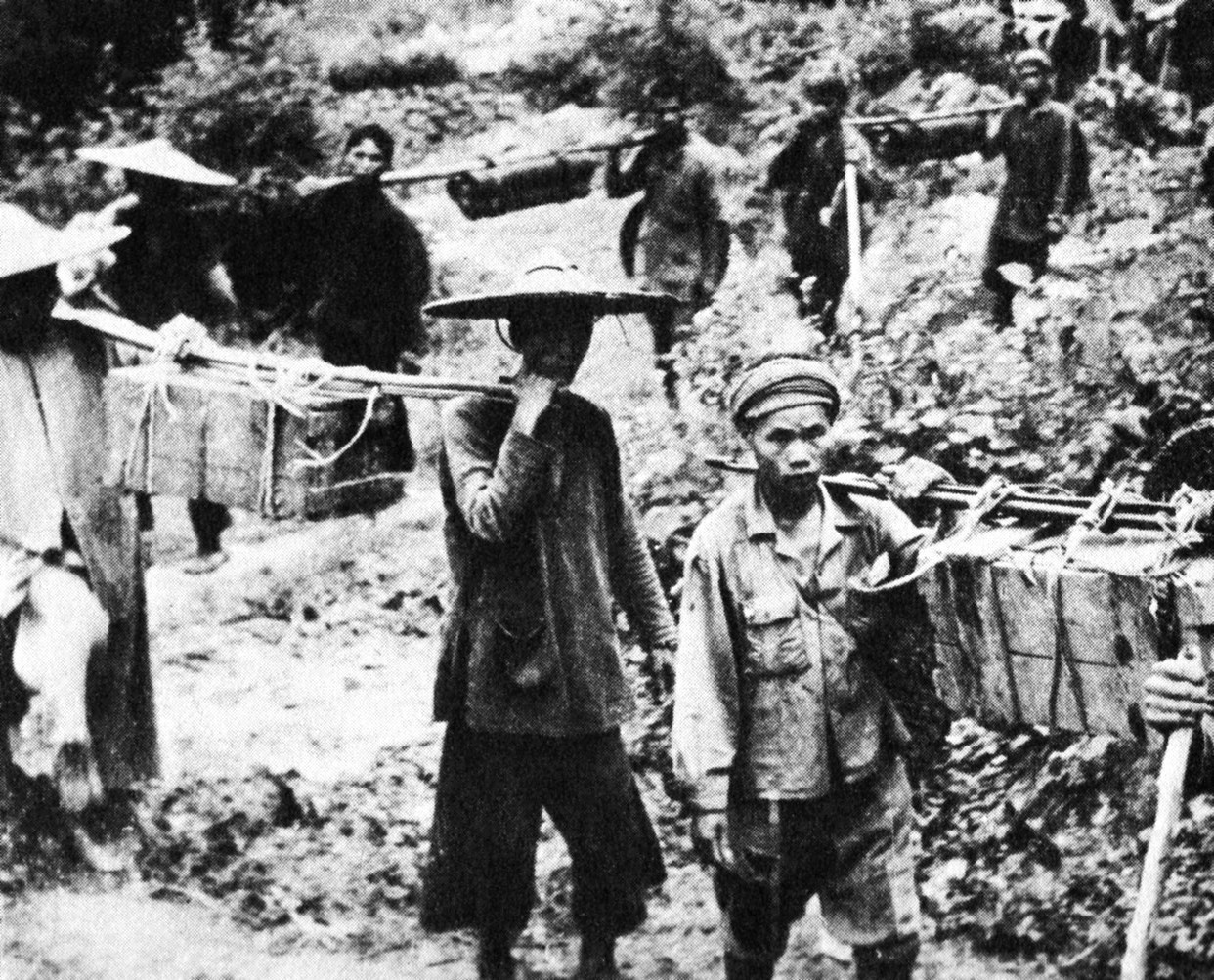
Arms and other aid to the Viet Cong were first carried by porters down what came to be called the Ho Chi Minh trail in August 1959.

17 August

The Draper Committee, a bi-partisan committee of prominent Americans appointed by President Eisenhower to study the impact of foreign aid, praised the "effectiveness of the [South] Vietnamese armed forces" and endorsed the Eisenhower Administration's policies in Vietnam. A dissenter on the committee was General Lawton Collins who criticized Diệm for his "refusal to admit the development of a loyal opposition" and opposed Diệm's proposal to increase the size of the ARVN from 150,000 to 170,000 soldiers. The Draper Committee was created in reaction to the publication of the novel The Ugly American which had characterized much of American foreign aid as ineffective in fighting communism.

20 August

The first arms shipment from North Vietnam to the VC arrived in South Vietnam. Three hundred and eight men carried 4 rifles and 44 pounds (20 kg) of ammunition each, departing June 10 and making their way through the demilitarized zone to the upper end of the A Shau Valley where the arms and ammunition were turned over to the VC. The trek was carried out during the rainy season.

30 August

The 1959 South Vietnamese legislative election chose the members of South Vietnam's National Assembly to serve three-year terms. The election was comfortably won, with abundant fraud, by the party of President Diệm. The most prominent critic of the Diệm government, Phan Quang Dan, won despite efforts by the government to defeat him by bussing in soldiers to vote multiple times. However, Dan and another independent deputy were not permitted to attend the first meeting of the National Assembly and were arrested and charged with electoral fraud.

31 August

Ngo Dinh Nhu, the younger brother and chief adviser to President Diệm, failed in an attempt to assassinate Prince Norodom Sihanouk of Cambodia. Two suitcases were delivered to Sihanouks' palace, one addressed to the head of state, and the other to Prince Vakrivan, his head of protocol. The deliveries were labeled as originating from an American engineer who had previously worked in Cambodia and purported to contain gifts from Hong Kong. Sihanouk's package contained a bomb, but the other did not; however, Vakrivan opened both on behalf of the monarch and was killed instantly, as was a servant. The explosion happened adjacent to a room in the palace where Sihanouk's parents were present.

== September ==
4 September

A conference of U.S. Army intelligence officers concluded that the VC were not a serious threat and that "the general security situation in the South Vietnam countryside shows a steady improvement."

26 September

In the Mekong Delta near the Cambodian border, approximately 100 VC guerrillas identified only as the "2nd Liberation Battalion" ambushed 360 ARVN soldiers. The ARVN unit lost 12 killed, 14 wounded, 9 missing or captured and most of their weapons. This was the largest military engagement between the VC and the ARVN to date. Two weeks later, in the same province, 45 ARVN surrendered to a smaller number of VC.

30 September

President Diệm told General Williams that "the strategic battle against the VC has been won; now remains the tactical battle, which means the complete cleaning out of the many small centers of VC activity.

== November ==
9 November

MAAG in Saigon reported that the ARVN was conducting "operations...against remnants of dissidents and Viet Cong guerrillas" and that "successful operations against these anti-government forces has facilitated the release of the majority of Vietnamese military units from pacification missions and has permitted increased emphasis on training." The emphasis of U.S. training and assistance continued to be to develop a conventional army of 150,000 soldiers to repel an invasion from North Vietnam. MAAG had not yet provided any training to the para-military Self-Defense Corps (numbering 43,000) or the Civil Guard (numbering 53,000) which were responsible for most aspects of security in rural areas.

== December ==
25 December

General Phoumi Nosavan took power in Laos in a bloodless coup.

In the last four months of 1959, the VC assassinated 110 local government leaders, mostly in rural areas.

Between 1956 and the end of 1959, four American soldiers were killed in South Vietnam.

U.S. military personnel in South Vietnam numbered 760. South Vietnamese armed forces numbered 243,000, including the Civil Guard and Self-Defense Corps.
