= William Harlan Hale =

American journalist (1910–1974)

William Harlan Hale (1910 – July 1974) was an American writer, journalist, and editor.

== Life and career ==
Hale was born in New York City, the son of William Bayard and Olga Unger Hale. He attended Riverdale Country School. Hale was considered "one of Yale's brightest of bright young men" in his youth, and co-founded the campus magazine Harkness Hoot.

In 1931, he married Jean Laughlin Barker of Santa Fe; they had two daughters and a son. In religion he was a lifelong Episcopalian and in politics, a Democrat.

Hale was associate editor of Vanity Fair in 1932, a columnist for The Washington Post in 1933–34, and editorial associate at Fortune from 1934 to 1936. His first book was Challenge to Defeat: Goethe's World and Spengler's Century (1932). In 1938, he published a novel, titled Hannibal Hooker. He also wrote an adventure novel, A Yank in the RAF (1940).

In an historical vein, Hale wrote a popular history of America, The March of Freedom (1946) and a biography of Horace Greeley, Horace Greeley, Voice of the People (1950; paperback reprint, 1961).

In World War II, Hale served in Army intelligence (Office of War Information, Psychological Warfare Branch of the Allied Expeditionary Force, writing memoranda on German public opinion), and worked again for military intelligence from 1948 to 1949. He visited Buchenwald on April 12, 1945.

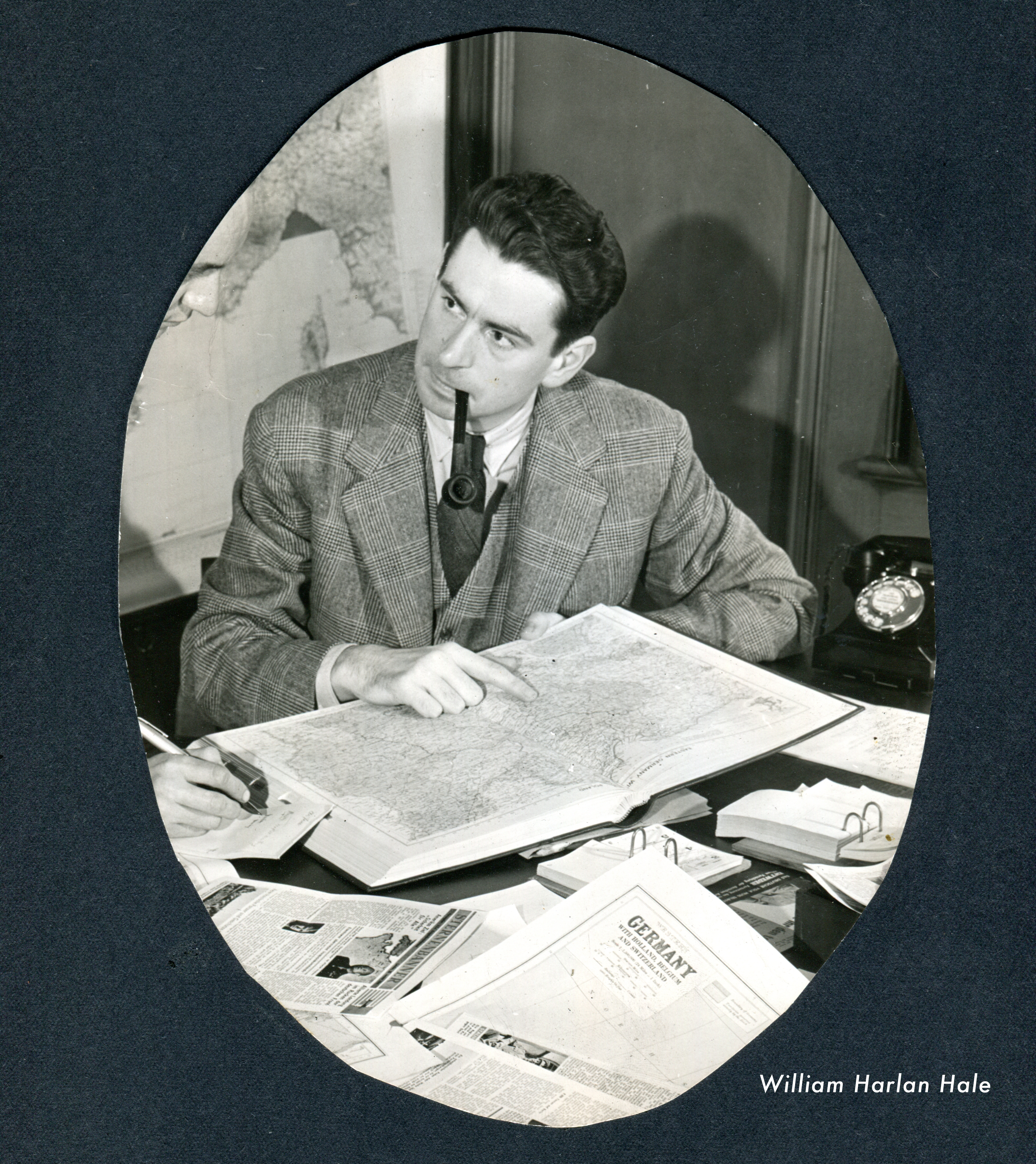

Hale worked as a journalist in Austria from 1950 to 1953. He was editor of The New Republic (1946–47), the Reporter, and Horizon (1958). He was the author of The Horizon Book of Ancient Greece (1965) and The Horizon Book of Eating and Drinking Through the Ages (1968). Articles for American Heritage formed the basis for his Innocence Abroad (1958).

Hale's papers are in the Yale University Library.
