= Margery Lewis =

American photographer

Margery Lewis (Smith) was an American photographer active from the 1940s to the 1970s.

== Biography ==
Margery Lewis' long-term relationship with photojournalist W. Eugene Smith overshadows her own career as a photographer in her own right. Their relationship began, and their son Kevin Eugene Smith was born (in 1954), while Smith was still married to his wife Carmen, with whom he had four children.

Lewis changed her name to Smith in the 1960s, but continued to use Lewis in picture credits.

== Professional photographer ==
Lewis was a portraitist of celebrities, especially musicians, artists and writers, including Leopold Stokowski, painter Paul Burlin and poet Carolyn Stoloff (both appearing in the March, 1963 issue of Horizon magazine), Elliott Carter, Norman Granz, and Aaron Copeland.

She continued to photograph into the 1970s.

== Recognition ==
Lewis’ photographs were included in two exhibitions at the Museum of Modern Art both assembled by the Museum’s curator of photography Edward Steichen; Always the Young Strangers, February 26–April 1, 1953, and, from 1955, the world-touring The Family of Man, seen by 9 million visitors, in which one of her 1954 photographs of couples at a high school dance, commissioned by Seventeen, was featured.

She produced images and articles for popular mid-century photography magazines.
