= Marshall B. Davidson =

American non-fiction writer

- Born: 26 April 1907; Fordham, New York
- Died: 8 August 1989 (aged 82); Manhattan, New York
- Other name: Nip
- Education: Princeton University (BS)
- Spouse: Ruth Bradbury Davidson
- Relatives: Garrison H. Davidson (brother); Jack Holt (uncle)

Marshall Bowman Davidson (26 April 1907 – 8 August 1989) was a historian and American culture writer. He was the author, co-author or editor of over twenty-five books and served as an editor of and contributor to Horizon and American Heritage magazines.

== Biography ==
Bowman was born in the Fordham neighborhood of The Bronx, New York City. His older brother was United States Army Lieutenant General Garrison H. Davidson and his uncle was motion picture actor Jack Holt. Bowman attended Townsend Harris Hall in Manhattan. He then went to Princeton University, where he was captain of the swimming team. In 1928, Bowman graduated with a B.S. degree in history.

Bowman worked at the Metropolitan Museum of Art from 1935 to 1961 as an associate curator of the American Wing and director of publications. He then became managing editor of Horizon Books.

Bowman married Ruth "Petey" Bradbury on August 20, 1935. She served as editor of The Magazine Antiques. They did not have any children and she died in 1979.

Bowman died of pneumonia at the Lenox Hill Hospital in Manhattan.

== Books ==
- Life in America. Houghton Mifflin. 1951. 2 vols.
- The American Heritage History of Colonial Antiques. American Heritage Publishing Company. 1967. 384 pp.
- The Horizon Concise History of France. American Heritage Publishing Company. 1971. 219 pp. ISBN 978-0070154537
- The American Heritage History of Notable American Houses. American Heritage Publishing Company. 1971. 383 pp. ISBN 978-0070154681
- The American Heritage History of the Writers' America. American Heritage Publishing Company. 1973. 403 pp. ISBN 978-0070154353
- The American Heritage History of the Artists' America. American Heritage Publishing Company. 1973. 402 pp. ISBN 978-0070154384
- The Horizon History of the World in 1776. American Heritage Publishing Company. 1975. 352 pp. ISBN 978-0070154315
- New York: A Pictorial History. Scribner. 1977. 357 pp. ISBN 978-0684147727
- The American Wing: A Guide. Metropolitan Museum of Art. 1980. 176 pp. ISBN 978-0870992384
- 500 Years of Life in America: An Illustrated History. Abradale-Abrams. 1983. 256 pp. ISBN 978-0810980778
- The American Wing at the Metropolitan Museum of Art, with Elizabeth Stillinger. Metropolitan Museum of Art. 1985. 352 pp. ISBN 978-0870994241
