= Walter Karp =

American journalist

Walter Bernard Karp
- Born: May 14, 1934; Brooklyn, New York, U.S.
- Died: July 19, 1989 (aged 55); Manhattan, New York, U.S.
- Education: Columbia University
- Occupations: Journalist, Historian
- Spouse: Regina Pollack
- Children: 2
- Writing career
- Genres: Science, politics, history

Walter Bernard Karp (May 14, 1934 – July 19, 1989) was an American journalist, historian, and writer who published in magazines such as American Heritage and Horizon, and was also a contributing editor for Harper's Magazine (edited by friend Lewis H. Lapham), which re-published some of his political history books in 2003. As a historian, he emphasized the close relationship between domestic and international politics, and the shallowness of the modern two-party system of the US, proposing power and militarism, not money, as the corrupting influences upon politics.

== Life ==
Walter Karp was born in Brooklyn, New York, the son of Jewish parents, Morris and Libbie Karp. He studied anthropology at Columbia College of Columbia University, and graduated as valedictorian of the class of 1955.

Karp began his career as a popular science writer, penning a young-adult book about Charles Darwin called Charles Darwin and the Origin of Species in 1968. Later, he began writing about politics, and his opposition to the Vietnam War. In 1969, Karp and H. R. Shapiro, a friend and fellow writer, founded the fortnightly magazine The Public Life, which W. H. Auden praised.

As an intellectual, he named Thomas Jefferson and Hannah Arendt as two great influences, and the Founding Fathers of the United States as political influences, thus the eighteenth-century inflection of his literary style.

Karp was married to Regina Karp, née Pollack. The couple had two children.

Karp died in 1989 after undergoing surgery at Roosevelt Hospital, having been admitted previously for a blockage and enlargement in his colon. He was 55.

== Works ==
The Politics of War: The Story of Two Wars Which Altered Forever the Political Life of the American Republic 1890–1920 (1979) reports how William McKinley impelled the United States to fight the Spanish–American War (April to August 1898) and how Woodrow Wilson compelled intervention to the First World War (1914–18) and how they determined the emergence of the US as an imperial world power.

What impelled the US to fight Spain was not a war-crazed public infected with yellow journalism, as most historians have for conventional wisdom, but the collusion of an ambitious political party pair seeking to again make the US a country "safe for oligarchy." That was their response to the Populist movement of the 1890s, a destabilising threat to the "Republican–Democrat" two-party system. Moreover, despite the US defeating Imperial Spain, within the Republican Party, the Populist movement soon yielded to a Progressive movement led by Senator Robert La Follette, which culminated in the presidential election of 1912 in which more than 70 per cent of the votes were against the incumbent US president, William Howard Taft (1909–1913), who came third: "The privileged interests... seemed about to receive their death blow. Government of, by, and for the people was about to be restored to the American Republic."

However, the man elected president in 1912, Woodrow Wilson, was "a man driven by vaunting ambition" with very different plans for the republic. Originally very conservative with a strong belief in laissez-faire capitalism, he believed himself a "man of destiny" and altered his political beliefs to seek elected office. As a historian, Wilson dreamed of negotiating a treaty among the warring European imperial powers but knew that as president, he would have to compel the US into the Great War to fulfil his statesman's ambition of setting Imperial Europe aright. Hence his presidential favoritism towards the Allies and inflexible antagonism towards the Germans and the Central Powers, despite every belligerent having violated international law in prosecuting the war. To suit his political, man-of-destiny ambitions, Wilson embroiled the US in a European war.

Most noteworthy is the First Red Scare (1917–1920), the Wilson administration's extended wartime suppression of the civil liberties of antiwar critics. He compared the wartime behaviors of Lincoln and Wilson: "Americans under Lincoln enjoyed every liberty that could possibly be spared; in a war safely fought 3,000 miles from our own shores, Americans under Wilson lost every liberty they could possibly be deprived of." The wartime suppression of liberty "struck the American Republic a blow from which it has never recovered."

In 2003, Harper's Magazine editor Lewis Lapham compared The Politics of War to the works of Henry Brooks Adams by emphasising its contemporary relevance: "Karp offers a clearer understanding of our current political circumstance than can be found in any two or twenty of the volumes published over the last ten years by the herd of Washington journalists grazing on the White House lawn."

Liberty Under Siege: American Politics 1976–1988 (1989) develops the thematic line of articles written for Harper's Magazine, proposing that the Republican and the Democratic Parties colluded to undermine the presidency of the "feeble Democrat" Jimmy Carter (1976–80), and replace him with the "liar and tyrant" Ronald Reagan (1980–84, 84–88). Despite the harshly-accurate assessment of the time chronicled, Liberty Under Siege concludes reiterating the historian's trust in Jeffersonian democracy.

"The Two Americas" article presents his perspectives of democracy and patriotism; citing the Pledge of Allegiance, he proposes that the United States of America is two countries, a republic and a nation; the republic "exists for its own sake" but the nation exists only relative to other nations and so is most alive when at war. He often quoted Lincoln's praise of Kentucky Senator Henry Clay as a man who "loved his country, partly because it was his own country, but mostly because it was a free country."

== Bibliography ==
=== Political Books ===
- Karp, Walter (1973). Indispensable Enemies: The Politics of Misrule in America. New York: Franklin Square Press. ISBN 1-879957-13-2.
- Karp, Walter (1979). The Politics of War: The Story of Two Wars Which Altered Forever the Political Life of the American Republic 1890–1920. Mt. Kisco, NY: Moyer Bell Ltd. ISBN 1-879957-55-8. Lewis Lapham's introduction to the 2003 reissue of The Politics of War
- Karp, Walter (1989). Liberty Under Siege: American Politics 1976–1988. New York: Franklin Square Press. ISBN 1-879957-11-6.
- Karp, Walter (1993). Buried Alive: Essays on Our Endangered Republic. New York: Franklin Square Press. ISBN 1-879957-04-3.

=== Historical Books ===
- Karp, Walter (1965). The Smithsonian Institution: An Establishment for the Increase & Diffusion of Knowledge Among Men. New York: Smithsonian Institution.
- Karp, Walter (1968). Charles Darwin and the Origin of Species. New York: Harper & Row.

== Quotes ==
- "The left and right wings of the party establishment--two great pinions of an ancient bird of prey." This is a paraphrase of Eugene V. Debs, who said, "You cannot expect any help from either of the two old parties. They are simply the two wings to the same foul bird of prey." See his speech delivered on June 16, 1902, "We Must Gain Possession of the Tools of Trade."
- "The public school system: 'Usually a twelve year sentence of mind control. Crushing creativity, smashing individualism, encouraging collectivism and compromise, destroying the exercise of intellectual inquiry, twisting it instead into meek subservience to authority.'"
- "The most esteemed journalists are precisely the most servile. For it is by making themselves useful to the powerful that they gain access to the 'best' sources."
