= 1958 in the Vietnam War =

← 1957 1959 →
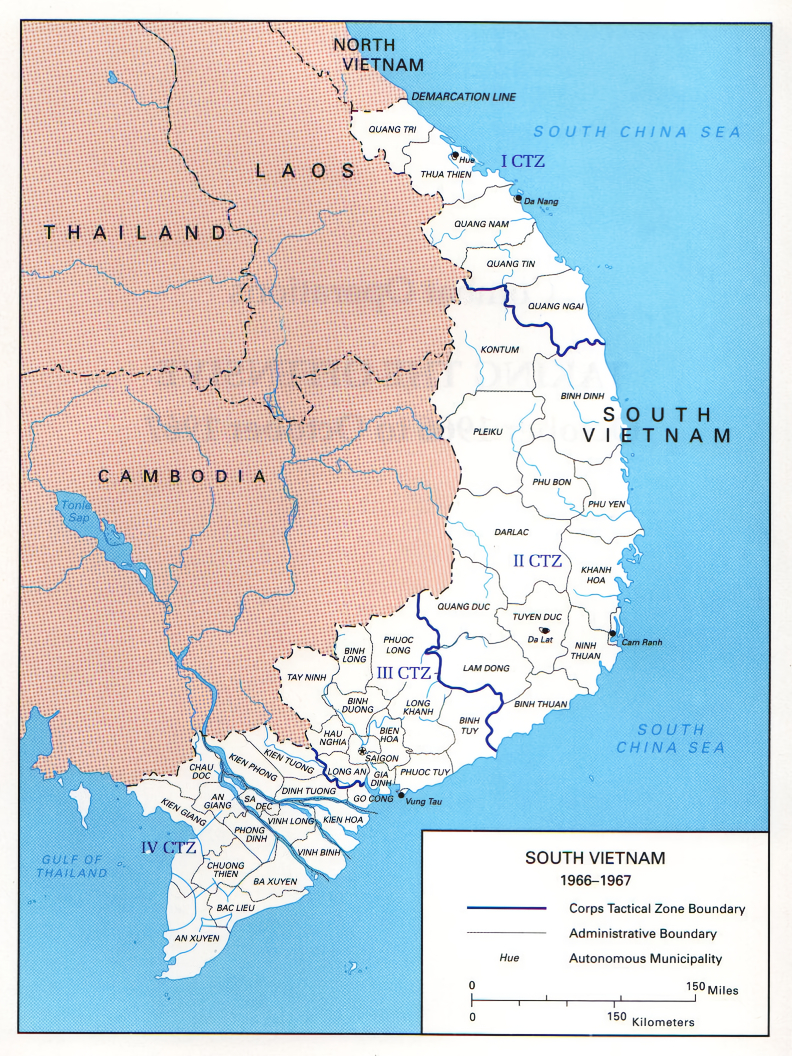
- A map of South Vietnam showing provincial boundaries and names and military zones (1, II, III, and IV Corps).
Location	Indochina

Belligerents
South Vietnam	Anti-government insurgents: (Vietnam) Viet Minh cadres

In 1958, the upswing in violence against the government of South Vietnam continued, much of which was committed by the communist-dominated insurgents now called the Viet Cong (VC). In South Vietnam, President Ngô Đình Diệm appeared to be firmly in power, although many American officials expressed concern about the repressive nature of his regime. The United States continued to finance most of the budget of the government of South Vietnam. North Vietnam continued to campaign for reunification with the South while focusing on its internal economic development, but pressure from hard-pressed communists in the South was forcing the North to contemplate a more active military role in overthrowing the Diệm government.

== January ==
8 January

U.S. Ambassador Elbridge Durbrow and the heads of other U.S. government agencies in South Vietnam gave a negative assessment of the Diệm government to Washington. They stated that discontent with the Diệm government in rural areas was growing and a growing problem with internal security was anticipated. In the cities, Diệm's secretive Cần Lao Party had succeeded in infiltrating many organizations and was feared. General Samuel Tankersley Williams, head of the Military Assistance Advisory Group (MAAG) for Vietnam, refused to concur with the report stating that he did not have "concern regarding internal security, the economic situation, or the executive ability of the government of [South] Vietnam."

23 January

Troubled by reports of oppression in South Vietnam, Socialist Norman Thomas resigned from the American Friends of Vietnam, a prominent lobbying group which supported the Diệm government.

== February ==
February 12

An Army of the Republic of Vietnam (ARVN) truck was ambushed by insurgents and all occupants were killed. This was one of several attacks in February on government and military personnel in the Mekong Delta region of southernmost South Vietnam.

28 February

Three hundred Bình Xuyên insurgents attacked the Minh Thanh Rubber Plantation north of Saigon. The Government sent two ARVN divisions to attempt to hunt down the insurgents. Most of the incidents of violence in South Vietnam were committed by the remnants of the Binh Xuyen criminal gang and the Cao Đài and Hòa Hảo religious sects which had been suppressed by the Diệm government in 1955 and 1956. VC "political advisers" were often attached to the insurgents.

== March ==
As part of their efforts to advance the Unification referendum, North Vietnam sent letters to the Government of South Vietnam proposing a loosening of economic restrictions between the two countries and preparations for a "free general elections by secret ballot". The messages were either rebuffed or ignored by the South Vietnamese government.

7 March

Phạm Văn Đồng, Prime Minister of North Vietnam, sent a letter to Diệm recommending that delegates from both nations should meet.

== April ==
18 April

At a communist party meeting, Đồng stated the North should pursue reunification of Vietnam by peaceful means. The statement highlighted a dispute among North Vietnamese leaders. Lê Duẩn and Lê Đức Thọ favored support for an insurgency in South Vietnam to unite the two Vietnams by force.

26 April

Diệm rejected Đồng's 7 March letter requesting a conference, calling it a propaganda ploy.

30 April

The CIA estimated that the VC numbered 1,700 armed men.

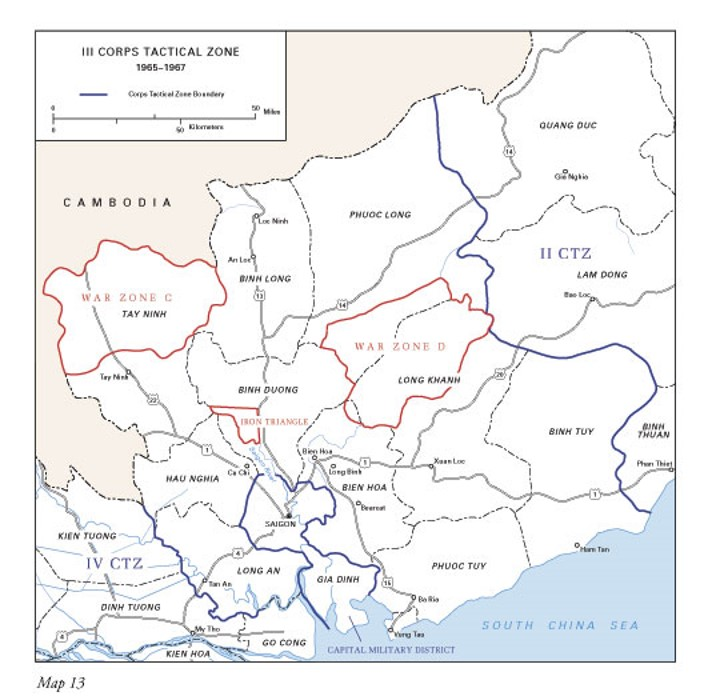
War Zones C, D, and the Iron Triangle were Viet Cong strongholds near Saigon

== June ==
To defend themselves against the offensives of the ARVN, the VC — contrary to the wishes of North Vietnam — began organizing themselves into military units. The first battalion of VC troops was established in War Zone D in mid-1958. Zone D, about 40 kilometres (25 mi) northeast of Saigon, was an important communist base area.

== July ==
Communist party leaders met with representatives of the highland Montagnard people in Quang Ngai Province of South Vietnam to plan an uprising against the Diệm government.

Chinese Premier Zhou Enlai's advice to the North Vietnamese government was that it should focus on promoting "socialist revolution and reconstruction in the North." Zhou said that "realization of revolutionary transformation in the South was impossible at this stage." The North should await "proper opportunities." China was not enthusiastic about a military attempt by North Vietnam to unify the two Vietnams.

25 July

The U.S. Embassy in Saigon reported to Washington that "in many remote areas the central government [of South Vietnam] has no effective control."

== August ==
10 August

An insurgent force of 400 men raided the Michelin Rubber Plantation north of Saigon. The plantation was defended by a company security force and 200 ARVN. The defenders were taken by surprise and lost more than 100 weapons and $143,000 in cash. The raid was led by a Bình Xuyên commander with VC advisers. Diệm had visited the rubber plantation only a week earlier.

18 August

General Williams, the head of MAAG, opposed the use of the ARVN to respond to the growing number of VC attacks. He believed that the primary duty of the army was to contest an invasion of South Vietnam by the North Vietnamese army, a remote possibility in the view of most U.S. officials. MAAG training and equipment for the ARVN was focused on creating an army capable of fighting a conventional war.

Despite William's objections, in the latter part of 1958 the ARVN carried out several inconclusive operations against VC strongholds in the Mekong Delta (including the Plain of Reeds).

== September ==
Hilaire du Berrier published an article in the conservative magazine The American Mercury highly critical of the Diệm government and its American supporters. Du Berrier said that Diệm "was imposed on a people who never wanted him" and that the American public had "not been told the truth." He characterized U.S. policy as "misguided meddling" and the Diệm government as a "police state."

8 September

Chinese leader Mao Zedong introduced his "noose strategy" in a speech to Supreme State Council of China. He said that each new commitment of the United States overseas was a hangman's noose around America's neck. The multiplying commitments would ultimately strangle the U.S. and lead to the failure of "U.S. imperialism."

== October ==
4 October

The Ugly American, an anti-communist novel by Eugene Burdick and William Lederer, was published and serialized in The Saturday Evening Post. The novel was a scathing indictment of the personnel of the United States Department of State and other U.S. government agencies in the fictional Southeast Asian country of Sarakan, easily identifiable as South Vietnam. The book was influential and a bestseller. The hero of the book was modeled on CIA operative Colonel Edward Lansdale, a close collaborator of Diệm from 1954 to 1957. Most Americans working in Southeast Asia were portrayed as being insulated from the people of the country in which they lived. The communists by contrast worked in the villages winning "hearts and minds". The book has been criticized for its paternalistic portrayal of Southeast Asians and the simplistic solutions it advanced to defeat communism.

The Ugly American contrasted sharply with Graham Greene's 1955 novel The Quiet American which portrayed a Lansdale-like character as naive and ineffective.

== December ==
Le Duan, First Secretary of the Communist Party of Vietnam, made a clandestine visit to South Vietnam to assess the situation of the VC and the resistance to the Diệm regime. North Vietnam assessed late-1958 and early-1959 as the "darkest period" of the communists in South Vietnam when the forces of South Vietnam "truly and efficiently destroyed our party." Communist party membership declined and nearly disappeared in some parts of South Vietnam.

The PAVN and Pathet Lao occupied several villages in the Tchepone district of Laos, near the Demilitarized Zone dividing North from South Vietnam. North Vietnam claimed the villages had historically been part of Vietnam.

In December, the CIA intercepted a communication from Hanoi stating that the Party Central Committee had decided to "open a new stage of the struggle" and agreed to provide support to the communist resistance in South Vietnam.

The Diệm government, by the end of 1958, had killed 12,000 persons and arrested 40,000 in its campaign to repress the communists and other opposition in South Vietnam.
