= Horizon (American magazine) =

Defunct literary magazine

Horizon Magazine
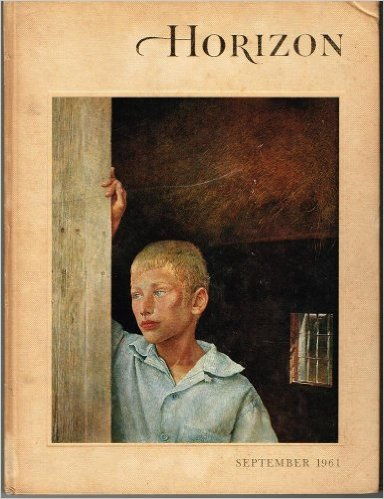
- The September 1961 issue of Horizon Magazine (Vol. 4, No. 1) included an interview of Andrew Wyeth by George Plimpton.
- Frequency: Bi-monthly; Quarterly
- First issue: 1958; 68 years ago
- Final issue: 1989; 37 years ago
- Company: American Heritage Publishing Company (1958–1978); Boone Inc. (1978–1989)
- Country: United States
- Language: English
- ISSN: 0018-4977

Horizon was a magazine published in the United States from 1958 to 1989. Originally published by American Heritage as a bi-monthly hardback, Horizon was subtitled A Magazine of the Arts. In 1978, Boone Inc. bought the magazine, which continued to cover the arts. Publication ceased in March 1989. Recently, American Heritage announced its intention to digitize essays from past issues.

== American Heritage years ==
The history magazine and book publisher American Heritage began Horizon: A Magazine of the Arts as a hardback bi-monthly in September 1958. The editor was Joseph J. Thorndike Jr., with James Parton as publisher. Contributors in the early years included:

- James Agee-author
- Cleveland Amory-author and commentator
- John Ashbery-poet and critic
- Fernand Auberjonois-journalist
- Louis Auchincloss-lawyer, novelist, historian
- W.H. Auden-poet
- Carlos Baker-literary critic
- Correlli Barnett-historian
- Jacques Barzun-historian
- Saul Bellow-writer
- Ingmar Bergman-filmmaker
- Charles Berlitz-linguist
- Morris Bishop-historian
- Lesley Blanch-writer and historian
- Fawn M. Brodie-historian
- Ronald Blythe-writer
- Marie Boas Hall-historian
- Jacob Bronowski-historian, television commentator
- Frances M. Brown-artist, painter
- Robert Brustein-drama critic
- Anthony Burgess-novelist
- Joseph Campbell-mythologist and writer
- John Canaday-critic, art historian
- Lionel Casson-classicist
- Arthur C. Clarke-science fiction writer, futurist
- Henry Steele Commager-historian
- Malcolm Cowley-novelist, poet, literary critic
- Basil Davidson-historian
- Marshall B. Davidson-historian
- Agnes De Mille-dancer
- Rene Dubos-microbiologist and writer
- Loren Eiseley-anthropolist and writer
- Sir John Elliott-historian
- Timothy Foote-writer and editor
- Alfred Frankenstein-art and music critic
- Antonia Fraser-novelist and biographer
- John Kenneth Galbraith-economist
- Vicki Goldberg-critic, author, photo historian
- Paul Goldberger-architectural critic
- Stephen Jay Gould-biologist and historian of science
- Robert Graves-poet and writer
- Geoffrey Grigson-essayist
- Henry Anatole Grunwald-journalist and editor
- Emily Hahn-journalist and author
- William Harlan Hale-writer and editor
- Gerald Heard-public intellectual, historian, cultural theorist
- Gilbert Highet-essayist
- Jamake Highwater-writer and journalist
- Paul Horgan-author and historian
- Robert Hughes-critic, television commentator
- Julian Huxley-biologist
- Ada Louise Huxtable-architectural critic
- Paul Johnson-journalist, historian, speechwriter
- Walter Karp-journalist, historian, writer
- Murray Kempton-journalist, social and political commentator
- Arthur Koestler-author, journalist
- Irving Kristol-columnist, journalist, writer
- Anthony Lewis- public intellectual, journalist
- Margery Lewis- photographer and writer
- John Lukacs-historian
- Russell Lynes-art critic
- Harold Macmillan -British politician
- D. M. Marshman Jr.-screenwriter
- Garrett Mattingly-historian
- W. Somerset Maugham-playwright, novelist, short story writer
- Charles L. Mee-playwright and historian
- Thomas Meehan-essayist
- Leonard B. Meyer-composer
- James A. Michener-novelist
- Nancy Mitford-novelist, biographer, journalist
- Herbert Mitgang-author, editor, playwright, television producer
- Jan Morris-travel writer (as both James and Jan Morris)
- Lance Morrow-essayist and writer
- Lewis Mumford-historian, sociologist, philosopher, literary critic
- Ogden Nash-poet and cartoonist
- Frank O'Hara-poet and writer
- Régine Pernoud-French historian and archivist
- George Plimpton-writer
- J. H. Plumb-historian
- Raymond Postgate-author, social historian, novelist, gourmet
- J. B. Priestley-novelist and playwright
- V. S. Pritchett-writer and literary critic
- Edwin O. Reischauer-educator and historian
- Bernard Rudofsky-writer, architect, collector, designer
- John Russell-art critic
- Carl Sagan-astronomer, writer, television commentator
- Richard Schickel-critic
- Harold C. Schonberg-music critic
- Erich Segal-educator, novelist
- Tim Severin-travel writer
- Israel Shenker-critic
- Red Smith-sports writer
- Jean Stafford-novelist
- Freya Stark-travel writer
- Roger Starr-planning official, author, editorial writer
- Francis Steegmuller-biographer, translator, fiction writer
- Wallace Stegner-novelist, environmentalist
- Irving Stone-essayist
- Igor Stravinsky-composer
- W. A. Swanberg-historian
- Allan Temko-architectural critic
- James Thurber-humorist
- Alvin Toffler-writer and futurist
- Arnold J. Toynbee-historian
- Hugh Trevor-Roper-historian
- Kurt Vonnegut Jr.-novelist
- C. V. (Dame Victoria) Wedgwood-historian
- Lynn Townsend White Jr.-historian
- Theodore H. White-politician journalist, historian
- P. G. Wodehouse-novelist
- William Zinsser- writer, editor, literary critic, teacher

While Horizon remained bi-monthly up to July 1962, volume IV, there was an anomalous volume V that had eight issues. After November 1963, there were only four issues a year, and the magazine changed its issue dates to the current season rather than a month. This is shown in Linda Prestwidge's master table of contents for hard cover Horizon issues in the reference link below. From Winter 1964, volume VI, to January 1977, volume XIX, Horizon produced four issues a year which are still prized by collectors and actively traded on the Internet.

The May 1977 issue contained an insert from the publisher, Rhett Austell, informing the subscribers that Horizon would become a monthly magazine in soft cover. The reason was plainly financial. Horizon was not able to attract enough subscribers to maintain the luxury magazine devoted to the arts and history that had been envisioned by Thorndike and Parton. Austell referred in this insert to "a time of inflationary prices" and announced that Otto Fuerbringer, a former editor at Time magazine, had been hired as editor of Horizon. There was an editorial in this issue describing the changes in the quality of the printing, binding, and content imposed by the shorter time between issues.

The July 1977 issue, volume XIX, number 4, had another insert from the publisher confirming that this would be the last hard-cover issue. The response from the subscribers to the lower quality of printing and binding and a new emphasis on current events was overwhelmingly negative, resulting in the sale of Horizon to Boone, Inc. a year later.

American Heritage also published books under the Horizon name, such as 1961's Horizon Book of the Renaissance, edited by Richard M. Ketchum and written by Plumb, with contributors including Trevor Roper, Kenneth Clark, Iris Origo and Jacob Bronowski. (OCLC 283425).

== Boone years ==
In December 1978, publication of Horizon moved from New York City, New York, to Tuscaloosa, Alabama, and the magazine changed to a softcover format, published monthly. The new owner was Boone Inc., with editor and publisher Gray D. Boone. Contributors included Robert Joffrey, Alan Rich, Lanford Wilson, Ray Bradbury and Brendan Gill. Publication ceased eleven years later, with volume 32, number 2, March/April 1989.
