= Lionel C. McGarr =

US Army general (1904–1988)

Lionel Charles McGarr
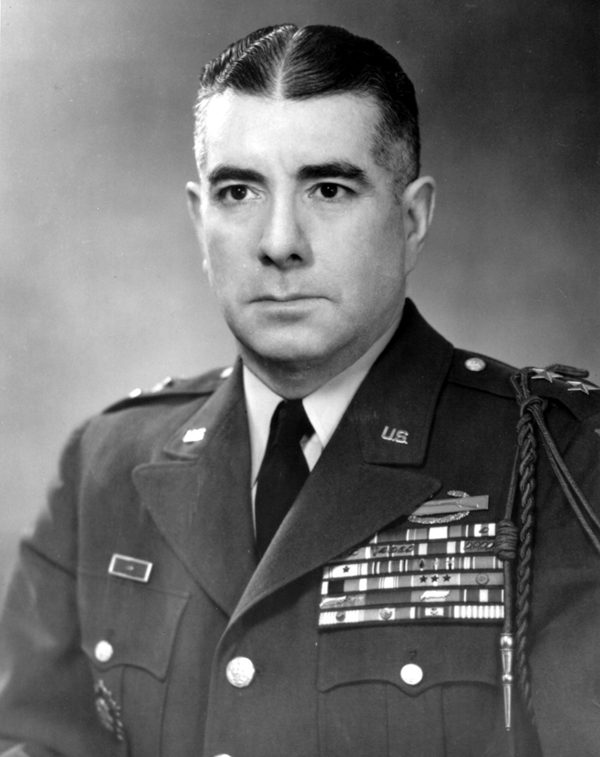
- McGarr in 1960, shortly before his promotion to lieutenant general
- Born: March 5, 1904; Yuma, Arizona
- Died: November 3, 1988 (aged 84); San Francisco, California
- Burial place: San Francisco National Cemetery
- Military career
- Allegiance: United States of America
- Branch: United States Army
- Service years: 1928–1962
- Rank: Lieutenant General
- Commands: 30th Infantry Regiment; 350th Infantry Regiment; Allied Prisoner of War Command – Korea; 7th Infantry Division; US Army Caribbean Command; Army Command and General Staff College; Military Assistance Advisory Group – Vietnam
- Conflicts: World War II; Korean War; Vietnam War
- Awards: Distinguished Service Cross; Distinguished Service Medal (2); Silver Star (2); Legion of Merit (3); Bronze Star (5); Purple Heart (7); Air Medal

Lionel Charles McGarr (March 5, 1904 – November 3, 1988) was a lieutenant general in the United States Army and commander of the Military Assistance Advisory Group – Vietnam.

== Early life and start of military career ==
McGarr as a United States Military Academy cadet c. 1928

McGarr was born in Yuma, Arizona on March 5, 1904, and graduated from the United States Military Academy in 1928. After receiving his commission as a second lieutenant of infantry he served in command and staff positions of increasing rank and responsibility, including assignments in Hawaii, California and Georgia.

== World War II ==
McGarr saw extensive combat in North Africa and Europe during World War II as commander of the 30th Infantry Regiment from October 1943 to December 1944, acting assistant division commander of the 3rd Infantry Division from December 1944 to January 1945, and again commander of the 30th Infantry Regiment from January to May 1945.

== Post World War II ==
McGarr was assistant division commander of the 3rd Infantry Division from 1945 to 1946, and he graduated from the National War College in 1947, afterwards serving in the intelligence section of the Army General Staff.

In 1948 he was named commander of the 350th Infantry Regiment in Austria, in 1949 he became tactical inspector for U.S. Tactical Command in Austria, and from 1950 to 1951 he was U.S. Tactical Command's chief of staff.

== Korean War ==
McGarr served in the Korean War as assistant division commander of the 2nd Infantry Division in 1951 and later commander of Allied Prisoner of War Command – Korea. From October 1953 to May 1954 he was commander of the 7th Infantry Division.

== Post Korean War ==
From June 1954 to June 1956 McGarr commanded the US Army Caribbean Command. He was then appointed commandant of the Army Command and General Staff College.

== Service in South Vietnam ==
In September 1960 he was promoted to Lieutenant General and named commander of Military Assistance Advisory Group – Vietnam. He served at this post until July 1962 when, against McGarr's advice, U.S. military escalation began and he was succeeded by General Paul Harkins, who commanded MAAG-V's successor unit, Military Assistance Command – Vietnam.

== Awards and decorations ==
His awards include the Distinguished Service Cross, two Distinguished Service Medals, three Silver Stars, three Legions of Merit, five Bronze Stars and seven Purple Hearts.

Combat Infantryman Badge
Distinguished Service Cross		Army Distinguished Service Medal with bronze oak leaf cluster
Silver Star with bronze oak leaf cluster	Legion of Merit with bronze oak leaf clusters	Bronze Star Medal with Valor device and three bronze oak leaf clusters
Bronze Star Medal (second ribbon required for accouterment spacing)	Purple Heart with silver and bronze oak leaf clusters	Air Medal
American Defense Service Medal with service star	American Campaign Medal	European–African–Middle Eastern Campaign Medal with Arrowhead device and two silver campaign stars
World War II Victory Medal	Army of Occupation Medal with 'Germany' clasp	National Defense Service Medal with service star
Korean Service Medal with three bronze campaign stars	Armed Forces Expeditionary Medal	Commander of the Legion of Honour (France)
Croix de Guerre with Palm, Silver and Gold Stars (France)	Officer of the Order of Leopold (Belgium)	Croix de Guerre with Palm (Belgium)
Cross of Valour (Poland)	Order of Military Merit; Chungmu Medal (South Korea)	Order of National Security Merit; Gukseon Medal (South Korea)
United Nations Korea Medal	Vietnam Campaign Medal	Korean War Service Medal (retroactive)

Army Presidential Unit Citation with bronze oak leaf cluster	Republic of Korea Presidential Unit Citation	Republic of Vietnam Gallantry Cross Unit Citation

French Fourragère

=== Citation for Distinguished Service Cross ===
"The President of the United States takes pleasure in presenting the Distinguished Service Cross to Lionel C. McGarr, Colonel (Infantry), U.S. Army, for extraordinary heroism in connection with military operations against an armed enemy while serving with the 30th Infantry Regiment, 3d Infantry Division, in action against enemy forces on 6 September 1944. Colonel McGarr's outstanding leadership, personal bravery and zealous devotion to duty exemplify the highest traditions of the military forces of the United States and reflect great credit upon himself, the 3d Infantry Division, and the United States Army." - Headquarters, Seventh U.S. Army, General Orders No. 107 (1944)

== Retirement and death ==
After leaving South Vietnam McGarr retired at the Presidio, afterwards living in Lafayette, California until his death in San Francisco on November 3, 1988. He was buried at San Francisco National Cemetery, Section B, Site 1606A.
