= War in Vietnam (1954–1959) =

Phase of the war between North and South Vietnam

- Part of the Vietnam War, the Indochina Wars and the Cold War
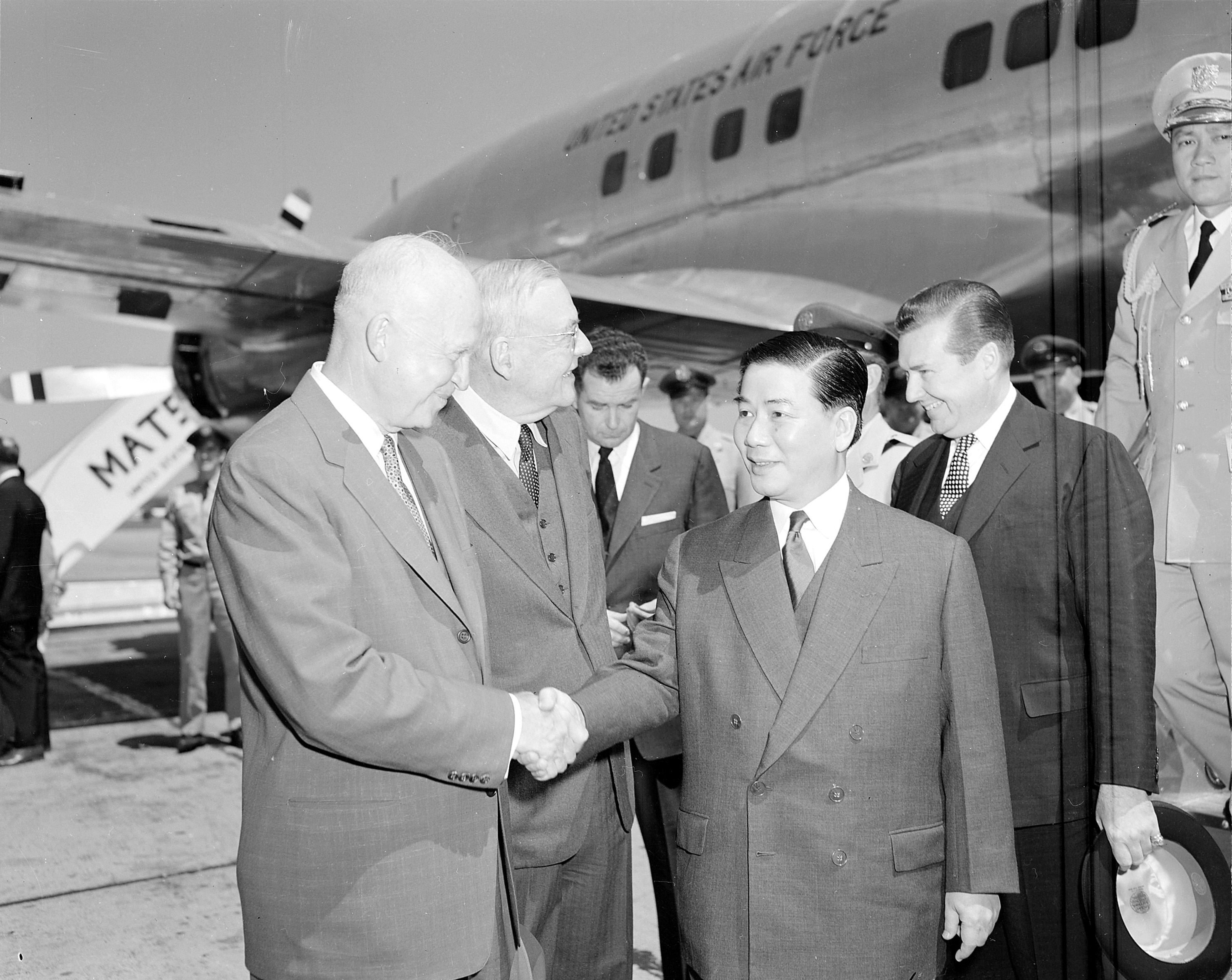
- U.S. President Dwight D. Eisenhower and Secretary of State John Foster Dulles greet South Vietnamese President Ngo Dinh Diem
Date	1954–1959
Location	North Vietnam, South Vietnam
Result	North Vietnam enters the war: Deposition of Bảo Đại; Overthrow of the State of Vietnam; Creation of the Republic of Vietnam (South Vietnam); Moderate Roman Catholic leader Ngô Đình Diệm becomes new South Vietnamese president; Anti-communism in South Vietnam; Communist insurgency in South Vietnam; South Vietnamese rebels take actions against Diệm rule

Belligerents
Anti-Communist forces: South Vietnam; Kingdom of Laos Supported by: United States	Communist forces: North Vietnam; Viet Minh (Laos) Pathet Lao Supported by: China	Cao Đài, Hòa Hảo and Bình Xuyên militias (until 1955)

Commanders and leaders
(South Vietnam) Ngô Đình Diệm (South Vietnam) Lâm Quang Thi (United States) Dwight D. Eisenhower	(North Vietnam) Hồ Chí Minh (North Vietnam) Lê Duẩn (North Vietnam) Trường Chinh (North Vietnam) Nguyễn Chí Thanh	

The 1954 to 1959 phase of the Vietnam War was the era of the two nations. Coming after the First Indochina War, this period resulted in the military defeat of the French, a 1954 Geneva meeting that partitioned Vietnam into North and South, and the French withdrawal from Vietnam (see First Indochina War), leaving the Republic of Vietnam regime fighting a communist insurgency with USA aid. During this period, North Vietnam recovered from the wounds of war, rebuilt nationally, and accrued to prepare for the anticipated war. In South Vietnam, Ngô Đình Diệm consolidated power and encouraged anti-communism. This period was marked by U.S. support to South Vietnam before Gulf of Tonkin, as well as communist infrastructure-building.

The period ended with major negotiations, but formal discussions had started as early as 1950, with less formal meetings during and immediately after the Second World War. France gave limited autonomy in February 1950, Associated States of Indochina (Vietnam, Laos, and Cambodia) within the French Union. The enabling agreement was signed among the five states on 23 December 1950, and was the prerequisite for direct U.S. aid to Indochina.

== U.S. missions to Indochina ==
U.S. aid to the non-Communist forces of the area had started in 1950, both with materiel and assistance to the French doing the primary training. It had to wait for U.S. aid that was administered by the Military Assistance Advisory Group, Indochina (MAAG-I), which had been established in October 1950 under the command of brigadier general (BG) Francis G. Brink, followed by major general (MG) T.J.H. Trapnell.

Starting in 1952, a more senior officer, lieutenant general (LTG) John W. O'Daniel, Commanding General, U.S. Army, Pacific (USARPAC), made three fact-finding trips to France, after Marshal Jean de Lattre de Tassigny, dying of cancer, had been replaced by General Raoul Salan on 1 April 1952, and after General Henri Eugène Navarre had succeeded General Salan in May of the following year. While he had no effect on French operations, he did build relationships. O'Daniel had been a division commander during the Korean War, so was not unknown since the French had forces in that war.

Nevertheless, the relationships both with the French and Vietnamese changed with the French defeat and gradual withdrawal. French trainers did not abruptly withdraw in 1954 after the Geneva accords, and, indeed, there was a French desire to stay involved in training the South Vietnamese. Part of this may have been pride, and partially a desire to maintain French influence.

France's painful withdrawal may have led to its lack of cooperation in European defense arrangements that included the United States. France rejected European Defense Community on August 30, 1954, possibly to thank the Soviets for help at Geneva. But it is certain that many French were persuaded that the U.S. and the UK furnished inadequate support to France during the latter phases of the war, and at the Conference. And it is equally certain that American policy in the aftermath of Geneva widely alienated affection for the U.S. in France, and created that lack of confidence which the Suez crisis of summer, 1956, translated into outright distrust.

All the foregoing tension resolved to two central issues between the United States and France. The first was the question of how and by whom Vietnam's armed forces were to be trained. In addition, the Geneva accords limited the number of advisers that could be assigned, and specified that equipment could be replaced, but that no additional quantities be given. These agreements were ignored by all.

The second, and more far-reaching, was whether Ngô Đình Diệm was to remain at the head of Vietnam's government, or whether he was to be replaced by another nationalist leader more sympathetic to Bảo Đại and France. The first issue was resolved relatively quickly. General Collins struck an agreement with General Ely in Vietnam by which, despite serious misgivings in Paris, France agreed to turn over the training of the Vietnamese army to the U.S. and to withdraw French cadres.

US personnel dealing with the Government of Vietnam had difficulty in understanding the politics. The diplomats were not getting clear information in 1954 and early 1955, but the CIA station "had and has no mandate or mission to perform systematic intelligence and espionage in friendly countries, and so lacks the resources to gather and evaluate the large amounts of information required on political forces, corruption, connections, and so on."

Also, after the end of French rule, Laos became independent, but with a struggle there among political factions, with neutralists heading the government and a strong Pathet Lao insurgency. Laos, also not to have had foreign military involvement according to the Geneva agreement, quickly had the beginnings of U.S. involvement as well as the continuing effects of North Vietnam sponsoring the Pathet Lao.

== Communist strategy ==
In a section titled "The Viet Minh Residue", the Report of the Office of the Secretary of Defense Vietnam Task Force or "Pentagon Papers" cited a study of twenty-three Viet Minh who, according to U.S. analysts, told consistent stories of being given stay-behind roles by the Viet Minh leadership going north. Some were given political roles, while others were told to await orders:

It is quite clear that even the activists were not instructed to organize units for guerrilla war, but rather to agitate politically for the promised Geneva elections, and the normalization of relations with the North. They drew much reassurance from the presence of the ICC, and up until mid-1956, most held on to the belief that the elections would take place. They were disappointed in two respects: not only were the promised elections not held, but the amnesty which had been assured by the Geneva Settlement was denied them, and they were hounded by the Anti-Communist campaign. After 1956, for the most part, they went "underground."

The Viet Minh went underground in 1956, but there was no major decision until 1959. A 1964 interrogation report also included in the Pentagon Papers determined:

The period from the Armistice of 1954 until 1958 was the darkest time for the VC in South Vietnam. The political agitation policy proposed by the Communist Party could not be carried out due to the arrest of a number of party members by RVN authorities. The people's agitation movement was minimized. However, the organizational system of the party from the highest to the lowest echelons survived, and since the party remained close to the people, its activities were not completely suppressed. In 1959 the party combined its political agitation with its military operations, and by the end of 1959 the combined operations were progressing smoothly.

== Southern strategy ==
After partition, the South worked on defining an identity. Its core had been Buddhist, but also had a number of influential groups, some religious and some simply taking power. Now, hundreds of thousands, close to a million, Northern refugees, mostly Catholic, joined the approximate 5 million population in the South.

Diệm, who was backed by the U.S. was an Annamite, from Central Vietnam (although not the Central Highlands) in the South upon taking power. In seeking political support from Southerners, he was not nearly as visible as Bảo Đại, nor was he seen as sympathetic to Buddhism or the smaller minorities. Diệm had to create a viable alternative to the Viet Minh in those areas where the French had provided security, both the cities and towns, but also in pockets of the rural areas inhabited by people of the regional or "folk" religions, such as the Cao Đài. The existing upper class might be wealthy, but the French had found it was neither popular nor internally cohesive.

While the Communists certainly had external assistance, they still considered themselves Vietnamese Communists. Clearly, pure geography would prevent them from being a Soviet satellite, and the long history of Chinese conquest and Sino-Vietnamese conflict would also limit the role of Great Powers in defining the DRV.

Vis-a-vis Great Powers and the South, however, the situation was quite different. John Foster Dulles and the Eisenhower administration had a priority of stopping Communism everywhere, and saw South Vietnam as a key barrier to Communist expansion. Diệm, despite his personal rigidity, distrust of those outside his immediate circle, and minority ethnicity and religion, was, most importantly to the U.S., neither pro-Communist nor pro-French. That he was a nationalist was secondary. The ideal of U.S. policy was for Diệm to form a representative government, oust Bảo Đại, and introduce democracy. French relations with the U.S., with France seen as an important anti-Communist resource in Europe, complicated the situation. The French ambassador to the U.S. warned John Foster Dulles that American support was being offered to Diệm without conditions that he form a stable and representative government. Guy le Chambre, French minister for the Associated States (i.e., Vietnam, Laos and Cambodia) reportedly felt Diệm would lead the country into disaster, but, since the U.S. had so visibly supported him,

We would prefer to lose in Vietnam with the US than to win without them...we would rather support Diệm knowing he is to lose and thus keep Franco-US solidarity than to pick someone who could retain Vietnam for the free world if this meant breaking Franco-US solidarity.

== Events ==
=== 1954 ===
Lieutenant General (LTG) Michael "Iron Mike" O'Daniel had been a U.S. observer in Indochina before Dien Bien Phu. Keyes Beech, a reporter for the Chicago Daily News, said that O'Daniel was optimistic of forming tank divisions and saving Dien Bien Phu, but was both sensitive to, and contemptuous of, the French. Beech quoted him as saying "I can understand why they are sensitive, but not what they are proud of."

In deference to French sensibilities and to ensure the seniority of the French Commander in Chief in Indochina, O'Daniel relinquished his third star and reverted to the rank of major general.

LTG O'Daniel was to have retired, but was convinced to come to Vietnam, in April 1954, as the third head of MAAG-I. Lieutenant General John W. O'Daniel, Commanding General, U.S. Army, Pacific (USARPAC), on three trips to Indochina. General O'Daniel's visits were made after General Jean de Lattre de Tassigny had been replaced by General Raoul Salan on 1 April 1952, and after General Henri-Eugene Navarre had succeeded General Salan in May of the following year. With him was then-Lieutenant Colonel William B. Rosson, who would later rise to high rank with the U.S. combat forces in Vietnam.

==== Agreements and arrivals in June ====
Ngô Đình Diệm arrived in Saigon from France on 25 June 1954. and, with U.S. and French support, was named Premier of the State of Vietnam by Emperor Bảo Đại, who had just won French assent to "treaties of independence and association" on 4 June.

On June 15, O'Daniel had established an informal agreement for U.S. training of native forces, with General Paul Ély, who had replaced Navarre in the dual roles of French High Commissioner and commander of military forces. This arrangement, however, was not to be formalized until December.

The initial Central Intelligence Agency (CIA) team in Saigon was the Saigon Military Mission (SMM), headed by United States Air Force Colonel Edward Lansdale, who arrived on 1 June 1954. The SMM was not part of the CIA Station in the Embassy. His diplomatic cover job was Assistant Air Attaché. The broad mission for the team was to undertake paramilitary operations against the enemy and to wage political-psychological warfare. Beech observed Lansdale to become an "adviser and confidant" of Diệm.

Working in close cooperation with the United States Information Agency (USIA), a new psychological warfare campaign was devised for the Vietnamese Army and for the government in Hanoi. Shortly after, a refresher course in combat psychological warfare was constructed and Vietnamese Army personnel were rushed through it.

The second SMM member, MAJ Lucien Conein, arrived on July 1. A paramilitary specialist, well-known to the French for his help with French-operated maquis in Tonkin against the Japanese in 1945, he was the one American guerrilla fighter who had not been a member of the Patti Mission. Conein was to have a continuing role, especially in the coup that overthrew Diệm in November 1963. In August, Conein was sent to Hanoi, to begin forming a guerilla organization. A second paramilitary team for the south was formed, with Army LT Edward Williams doing double duty as the only experienced counter-espionage officer, working with revolutionary political groups.

In August, a National Intelligence Estimate, produced by the CIA, predicted that the Communists, legitimized by the Geneva agreement, would take quick control of the North, and plan to take over all of Vietnam. The estimate went on that Diệm's government was opposed both by Communist and non-Communist elements. Pro-French factions were seen as preparing to overthrow it, while Việt Minh would take a longer view. Under command of the north, Viet Minh individuals and small units will stay in the south and create an underground, discredit the government, and undermine French-Vietnamese relations.

The final agreement between France and the U.S. was drafted between the senior French official in Vietnam, General Ely, and General J. Lawton Collins, President Eisenhower's special envoy to Saigon, on 13 December. Collins had served as Chief of Staff of the Army, and was the U.S. representative to the NATO Military Committee until 1956. His additional duties to Saigon were within the scope of the U.S. defense system centered on NATO; he had the personal diplomatic rank of Ambassador. This was his last assignment before retirement. Collins, in late 1954 and early 1955, supported the French recommendation that Diệm could not unify the Vietnamese nationalists.

=== 1955: Establishing two Vietnams ===
Cardinal Francis Spellman, in the region to visit U.S. troops, came to Vietnam in early January, celebrated masses, and gave a donation to Catholic Relief Services. While various reports suggested Spellman was Diệm's patron in the U.S., it seems likely that his visit was one for his coreligionists. Obviously, Spellman would not be unhappy with a Catholic leader, but the U.S. was quite aware that Diệm's Catholicism isolated him from the majority of South Vietnamese. When an Australian cardinal visited Vietnam shortly afterwards, J. Lawton Collins suggested to Diệm's brother, the Bishop of Huế, that there be a moratorium on high-level Catholic visits. Collins suggested that these visits aggravated the isolation of Diệm from the majority.

Lansdale also advised against Diệm being too visible with his Catholicism, citing an anti-Catholic bias in U.S. politics and a concern about creating a "Vatican state". As a response to Spellman's visibility as a member of the hierarchy, Lansdale encouraged U.S. support of Dr. Tom Dooley, a physician volunteer for the "Passage to Freedom" refugee program, who was Catholic but not clerical.

The U.S. and France, going into 1955, were dubious of Diệm's ability to unify South Vietnam, but there was no obvious alternative: anti-French, nationalist, anti-Bảo Đại. The French supported the Vietnamese National Army chief of staff, Gen. Nguyễn Văn Hinh. Hinh, working with the Cao Đài, Hòa Hảo, and Bình Xuyên, failed to organize a coup.

In January, the Republic of Vietnam received its first direct shipment of military supplies from the U.S. The U.S. also offered to train the fledgling National Army. A paramilitary group had cached its supplies in Haiphong, having had them shipped by Civil Air Transport, a CIA proprietary airline belonging to the Directorate of Support.

On February 12, 1955, the U.S. assumed responsibility for training Vietnamese forces, and the French disassociation began.

In Tây Ninh on February 22, the "United Front" against Diệm was formed, composed of Cao Đài, Hòa Hảo, Dan Xa Dang, Lien Minh and Bình Xuyên representatives. On 28 April, Diệm, against U.S. advice, against French advice, and against the advice of his cabinet, moved again against the sects.

In June, concerned that Viet Minh might win, Diệm abolished elections for village councils. Traditionally, the village level was autonomous. By replacing it at all, he inherited responsibility for corruption at that level. His appointments were usually from outside the villages; outsiders that he considered "dependable" Catholics, Northerners, or others not tied to the rural culture. This drove the villagers to the sort of conspiracy that they used against the French.

The Geneva agreements had specified the start of consultations on the 1956 referendum would begin, between Hanoi and Saigon, in July 1955. Diệm refused to enter into talks. On 20 July, Vietnam announced that it would not participate in talks for the reunification of North and South Vietnam through the elections that were scheduled for the following year, according to the Geneva agreements. Diệm pointed out that his government had not signed the Geneva agreements, and thus was not subject to them. The U.S. did not—as is often alleged—connive with Diệm to ignore the elections. The U.S. expected elections to be held and fully supported them.

==== Northern developments ====
In 1999, Robert McNamara wrote that both sides had missed opportunities. As he entered government in 1960, he freely admits he knew little about Vietnam, but his colleagues, ranging from the President and Vice President, to the Secretary of State and Chairman of the Joint Chiefs of Staff were convinced that China and the Soviet Union saw Vietnam as the starting point for the Communist conquest of Southeast Asia. Postwar discussions between McNamara and North Vietnamese told him that the Hanoi leadership saw the U.S. as the main enemy, "imperialists" bent on crushing the North and occupying the entire country. His 1999 conclusion (his emphasis) was

But what was the reality? Hanoi was no domino! Washington was no imperialist!...In 1961 the North Vietnamese government and the Kennedy Administration saw each other through fifteen years of Cold War rhetoric.

Both sides, according to McNamara, had missed opportunities both after the end of the Second World War, and at the Geneva conferences. In 1945, China was in civil war, and some of the Vietnamese politicians in exile were in China. An Office of Strategic Services team, commanded by MAJ Archimedes Patti, had been in China with the Vietnamese, and moved south with them; Washington paid little attention to their reporting, but Ho did not follow up the lack of response. According to Luu Doan Huynh, in November 1998, the Vietnamese were shocked that the Soviets and Chinese, their "big friends", were about to divide Vietnam. Huynh said his delegation failed, given that as encouragement, to seek out the Americans and explain the nationalist position. An American diplomat, Chester Cooper, was at the conference, and said he could never decide to whom, or if, the North Vietnamese were "reporting".

==== Autumn and winter; the fall of Diệm opponents ====
On 26 October Ngô Đình Diệm became President and Commander-in-Chief after defeating Bảo Đại in the referendum about the future form of government. The referendum, however, seemed less than ideally honest; Diệm's overall margin over Bảo Đại was 98.2 percent, and Diệm received 605,000 votes from the 405,000 registered voters of Saigon.

In America, President Eisenhower pledged his support for the new government and offered military aid. U.S. representatives told Hinh that another coup attempt would cut off U.S. aid. Diệm ordered Hinh out of the country in September, but Hinh refused. Eventually, Bảo Đại invited Hinh to France, and Hinh left Vietnam on November 19.

December was a time of land reform in both North and South. In the North, it was a period of ideological purges, with thousands of landowners executed or imprisoned (see Giap below).

In 1955, the first part of Diệm's land reforms involved resettling refugees and other land destitute Vietnamese on uncultivated land; the ownership of this land was not always clear.

=== 1956 ===
Under the French, the Montagnard tribes of the Central Highlands had had autonomy from the lowland colonial government. In 1956, these areas were absorbed into the Republic of Vietnam, and Diêm moved ethnic Vietnamese, as well as refugees from the North, into "land development centers" in the Central Highlands. Diệm intended to assimilate the unwilling tribes, a point of ethnic resentment that was to become one of the many resentments against Diệm. These resentments both cost internal support, and certainly were exploited by the Communists.

The US Military Assistance Advisory Group (MAAG) assumed responsibility, from French, for training South Vietnamese forces.

As part of a response to excesses in Northern land reform, for which Ho dismissed Trường Chinh as head of the program, Võ Nguyên Giáp, in the fall of 1956, offered the self-criticism for the Party:

We made too many deviations and executed too many honest people. We attacked on too large a front and, seeing enemies everywhere, resorted to terror, which became far too widespread. . . . Whilst carrying out our land reform program we failed to respect the principles of freedom of faith and worship in many areas . . . in regions inhabited by minority tribes we have attacked tribal chiefs too strongly, thus injuring, instead of respecting, local customs and manners. . . . When reorganizing the party, we paid too much importance to the notion of social class instead of adhering firmly to political qualifications alone. Instead of recognizing education to be the first essential, we resorted exclusively to organizational measures [using punishment].

In late 1956 one of the leading communists in the south, Lê Duẩn, returned to Hanoi to urge that the Vietnam Workers' Party take a firmer stand on national reunification, but Hanoi hesitated in launching a full-scale military struggle. In the fall of 1956, Diệm dealt strongly with another group not considered of his circle: the approximately 1,000,000 Chinese-identified people of Vietnam, who dominated much of the economy. He barred "foreigners", including Chinese, from 11 kinds of businesses, and demanded the half-million Vietnamese-born men, known as "uncles", "Vietnamize", including changing their names to a Vietnamese form. His vice-president, Nguyen Ngoc Tho, was put in charge of the program.

=== 1957 ===
As opposition to Diệm's rule in South Vietnam grew, a low-level insurgency began to take shape there in 1957, conducted mainly by Viet Minh cadres who had remained in the south and had hidden caches of weapons in case unification failed to take place through elections. This widespread campaign of terror included bombings and assassinations. Guerilla attacks reported included the killing of a group, not further identified, of 17 people in Châu Đốc in July, 1957. A District chief and his family were killed in September. In October, the clandestine radio of the "National Salvation Movement" began to broadcast support for armed opposition to Diệm. By year's end, over 400 South Vietnamese officials were killed. Operations appeared to solidify in October, beyond what might have been small group actions:

In Washington, U.S. intelligence indicated that the "Viet Minh underground" had been directed to conduct additional attacks on U.S. personnel "whenever conditions are favorable." U.S. intelligence also noted a total of 30 armed "terrorist incidents initiated by Communist guerillas" in the last quarter of 1957, as well as a "large number" of incidents carried out by "Communist-lead [sic] Hòa Hảo and Cao Đài dissident elements", and reported "at least" 75 civilians or civil officials assassinated or kidnapped in the same period.

In December 1957, the Soviet Union and China agreed to proposals to seat both the North and South, as independent countries, in the United Nations. Their decision was based on a growing east-west détente, but the North Vietnamese saw it as a sellout of their goal of reunification, and this may have led to their decision, in 1959, to seek reunification through military means.

Elbridge Durbrow became U.S. Ambassador in April, succeeding G. Frederick Reinhardt.

=== 1958: North Vietnam looks South ===
Beginning with a plantation raid in January and a truck ambush in February, steady guerilla ambushes and raids became more regular in 1958, and of serious concern to the GVN. This intensity level was consistent with Mao's Phase I, "the period of the enemy's strategic offensive and our strategic defensive." Mao's use of "strategic defensive" refers to the guerilla force making its presence known and building its organization, but not attempting to engage military units. George Carver, the principal CIA analyst on Vietnam, said in a Foreign Affairs article,

A pattern of politically motivated terror began to emerge, directed against the representatives of the Saigon government and concentrated on the very bad and the very good. The former were liquidated to win favor with the peasantry; the latter because their effectiveness was a bar to the achievement of Communist objectives. The terror was directed not only against officials but against all whose operations were essential to the functioning of organized political society, school teachers, health workers, agricultural officials, etc. The scale and scope of this terrorist and insurrectionary activity mounted slowly and steadily. By the end of 1958 the participants in this incipient insurgency, whom Saigon quite accurately termed the "Viet Cong", constituted a serious threat to South Viet Nam's political stability

On March 7, President Diệm received a letter from North Vietnam Prime Minister Phạm Văn Đồng proposing a discussion on troop reductions and trade relations as a renewed step towards reunification. On 26 April, Diệm rejected any discussion until North Vietnam had established "democratic liberties" similar to those in the South. A coordinated command structure was formed by Communists in the Mekong Delta where 37 armed companies were being organized in June 1958. North Vietnam invaded Laos and occupied parts of the country. Fall reported that the GVN lost almost 20% of its village chiefs through 1958.

=== 1959 ===
In March 1959, the armed revolution began as Ho Chi Minh declared a People's War to unite all of Vietnam under his leadership. His Politburo now ordered a changeover to an all-out military struggle. Thus began the Second Indochina War.

In July 1959, North Vietnam invaded Laos, opening the first tracks of what was to become the Ho Chi Minh Trail.
