= 1956 in the Vietnam War =

← 1955 1957 →
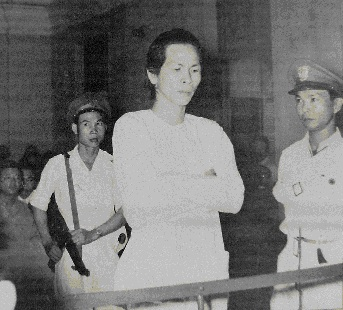
- Ba Cụt in Cần Thơ Military Court 1956
Location	Indochina

Belligerents
South Vietnam	Anti-government insurgents: (Vietnam) Viet Minh cadres Hòa Hảo sect

Commanders and leaders
	Ba Cụt

Strength
	Viet Minh: 4,300

Casualties and losses
US casualties: 1	

Ngo Dinh Diem consolidated his power as the President of South Vietnam. He declined to have a national election to unify the country as called for in the Geneva Accords. In North Vietnam, Ho Chi Minh apologized for certain consequences of the land reform program he had initiated in 1955. The several thousand Viet Minh cadres the North had left behind in South Vietnam focused on political action rather than insurgency. The South Vietnamese army attempted to root out the Viet Minh.

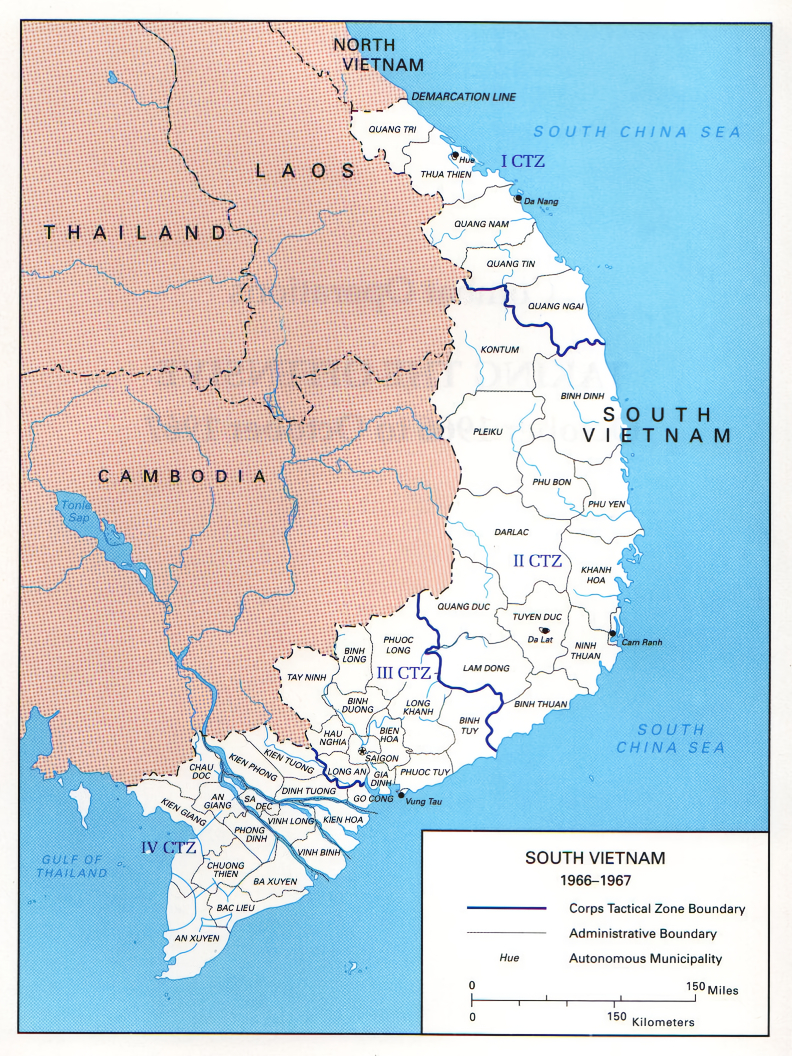
A map of South Vietnam showing provincial boundaries and names and military zones (1, II, III, and IV Corps).

France completed its military withdrawal from Vietnam. The United States expanded the number of its military advisers in South Vietnam. The first American killed in the Vietnam War died June 8 at the hand of another American soldier.

In 1956 the term Viet Cong came into use and gradually replaced the older term Viet Minh. The government-controlled Saigon press first started using the term referring to communists in South Vietnam as Viet Cong a shortening of Viet Nam Cong-San which means "Vietnamese Communist".

== January ==
11 January

President Diem issued Ordinance Number 6 which permitted the imprisonment of communists and others "dangerous to national defense and common security". Diem's anti-communist repression reduced communist party membership in South Vietnam by about two-thirds between 1955 and 1959, but the repression also alienated many non-communists.

In the words of scholar Bernard Fall, Ordinance No. 6 gave the Diem government "almost unchecked power to deal with the opposition--and the non-Communist opposition, least inured to clandestine operations, was hit hardest. The non-communist opposition to Diem came mostly at this time from the Cao Đài and Hòa Hảo religious sects and the Bình Xuyên criminal mafia.

== February ==
9 February

The Geneva Accords of 1954 forbade any increase in foreign military personnel in Vietnam and required all to withdraw by 1956. Adhering to the agreement, the U.S. had kept the level of its Military Advisory Assistance Group (MAAG) in Saigon at 342 personnel. Secretary of State John Foster Dulles with the concurrence of the Joint Chiefs of Staff of the U.S. Department of Defense authorized a "temporary mission" of 350 additional American military personnel to South Vietnam to salvage about $1 billion in military equipment left behind by the French military, now departed. By the end of 1957, nearly all of these additional personnel had been assigned to MAAG to train the South Vietnamese army (ARVN).

25 February

Soviet leader Nikita Khrushchev made his "secret speech" On the Cult of Personality and Its Consequences to the 20th Congress of the Communist Party of the Soviet Union. The speech was a major cause of the Sino-Soviet split in which China (under Chairman Mao Zedong) and Albania (under First Secretary Enver Hoxha) condemned Khrushchev as a revisionist. In response, they formed the anti-revisionist movement, criticizing the post-Stalin leadership of the Communist Party of the Soviet Union for allegedly deviating from the path of Lenin and Stalin. Khrushchev also announced a policy of Peaceful coexistence between the Soviet-allied socialist states and the capitalist bloc in contrast to the earlier Soviet policy of world revolution.

26 February

Scholar Hans J. Morgenthau defended the authoritarian practices of President Diem and his government in a newspaper article. "Considering the enormity of the task which confronts Diem, it would be ill-advised to be squeamish about the methods he used."

28 February

After occupying the Cao Đài sect's political center of Tây Ninh, the Diem government signed an agreement with Cao Dai leaders which permitted Cao Dai members to continue practicing their religion but prevented political activity.

== March ==
4 March

South Vietnam held elections for the National Constituent Assembly. Diem's candidates won 90 of 123 seats.

== April ==
Dr. Tom Dooley's book Deliver us from Evil was published in the United States and became a runaway best seller and influential anti-communist tract. Dooley described his work among Vietnamese refugees in Haiphong, North Vietnam, in 1954 and 1955. Hundreds of thousands of refugees, mostly Catholic, migrated from North Vietnam to South Vietnam in those years with transportation and assistance provided by the U.S. and French navies. Dooley's lurid accounts of communist atrocities committed on the refugees were not substantiated by other sources. Dooley was an informant of CIA agent Edward Lansdale who ran clandestine and propaganda programs encouraging Northerners, especially Catholics, to migrate south.

South Vietnam created the para-military Civil Guard and Self Defense Corps. The two organizations, each with about 50,000 troops, were stationed in villages and had the task of combating subversion and intimidation and freeing the South Vietnamese army from being responsible for protecting the rural population from the Viet Cong and other dissidents. Training for the Civil Guard and the Self Defense Corps was provided by Michigan State University.

13 April

Hoa Hao commander Ba Cụt was arrested by a patrol on 13 April 1956, and his remaining forces were defeated in battle.

28 April

The French military withdrawal from Vietnam was completed as the last soldier in the French Expeditionary Force left South Vietnam. A few French air force and navy personnel remained in South Vietnam as trainers.

== June ==
Diem abolished elections for village councils, apparently out of concern that large numbers of Viet Minh might win office. By replacing the village notables with appointed officials, Diem swept away the traditional administrative autonomy of the village officials, and took upon himself and his government the onus for whatever corruption and injustice subsequently developed at that level. These government appointees to village office were outsiders—northerners, Catholics, or other "dependable" persons—and their alien presence in the midst of the close-knit rural communities encouraged revival of the conspiratorial, underground politics to which the villages had become accustomed during the resistance against the French.

1 June

Senator John F. Kennedy gave the keynote speech at a conference of the American Friends of Vietnam, headed by General John W. O'Daniel. Kennedy lauded the accomplishments of President Diem and described South Vietnam as "the cornerstone of the Free World in Southeast Asia.... This is our offspring—we cannot abandon it, we cannot ignore its needs." Kennedy opposed the elections called for in the Geneva Accords (1954) saying that elections would be subverted by North Vietnam.

8 June

Richard B. Fitzgibbon Jr. became the first American to be killed in the Vietnam War. Fitzgibbon was serving as part of the Military Assistance Advisory Group (MAAG) (DET 1, 1173RD FOR MSN SQD), which was involved in training military personnel in South Vietnam. Fitzgibbon was not killed in action, but rather was murdered by another United States airman.

== July ==
6 July

Vice President Richard Nixon visited South Vietnam. He gave Diem a letter from President Eisenhower stating that the United States looked forward to many years of partnership with South Vietnam. In a speech in the Vietnamese constituent assembly, Nixon said that "the march of Communism has been halted."

Ho Chi Minh said that "the U.S. imperialists and the pro-American authorities in South Vietnam have been plotting to partition our country permanently and prevent the holding of free general elections as provided for by the Geneva Agreements"

11 July

The Joint Chiefs of Staff said that "the major threat [to South Vietnam] continues to be that of subversion." The CIA agreed. Despite those conclusions, American assistance to the South Vietnamese army was focused on building an army to deal with a conventional military attack from North Vietnam. The U.S. generals did not believe that the communists could mount an insurgency that would threaten the survival of South Vietnam. The concept of counterinsurgency received little attention in the U.S. army at that time. U.S. soldiers received only four hours of "counterguerrilla" training and training courses provided by the U.S. to the South Vietnamese army were almost "exact copies" of the military training given U.S. soldiers.

13 July

Lê Quang Vinh, popularly known as Ba Cụt, was a military commander of the Hòa Hảo religious sect, which operated from the Mekong Delta and controlled various parts of southern Vietnam during the 1940s and early 1950s. He was captured on April 13 and after a short trial, publicly guillotined on July 13, 1956, in Cần Thơ. Some followers, led by a hardcore deputy named Bay Dom, retreated to a small area beside the Cambodian border, where they vowed not to rest until Ba Cụt was avenged. Many of his followers later joined the Viet Cong and took up arms against Diệm.

20 July

The date specified in the Geneva Accords for national elections to re-unify North and South Vietnam. The elections were not held because Diem said South Vietnam was not a party to the Accords. Most observers believe that Ho Chi Minh would have won the elections easily In response to the planned elections not being held, the few remaining Viet Minh living within South Vietnam began a small-scale resistance campaign against Diem's government.

== August ==
17 August

Ho Chi Minh and other North Vietnamese officials publicly apologized for errors committed in North Vietnam's land reform program. Estimates of the number of people called "landlords" who were killed in the 1954–1956 period range from 3,000 to 50,000. 12,000 people were released from prisons after Ho's apology.

21 August

The Diem government issued Ordinance Number 47 which made it against the law, upon penalty of death, to assist any organization defined as communist. Diem defined "Communist" as "all persons and groups who resorted to clandestine political activity or armed opposition to his government".

== October ==
22 October

The Diem government issued Ordinance No. 57, a land reform program intended to transfer land from persons owning more than 100 hectares (250 acres) to landless and small landholders. Land reform was described as the most important step the South Vietnamese government could take to counter communist influence. This program expanded an earlier effort at land reform beginning in 1955. The Land reform program, however, was poorly implemented, landlords were able to retain most of their land, and peasants had to pay for the land they were eligible to receive. The provisions of the land reform program probably indicated the growing influence of large landowners rather than being a genuine attempt to re-distribute land to the poor and landless rural dwellers.

26 October

Diệm announced the adoption of a constitution for South Vietnam. The constitution gave Diem the power to declare and rule by "emergency" whenever he wished. It also gave him the right to suspend "temporarily" freedom of assembly, speech, and other civil rights.

== November ==
Diệm dealt strongly with another group not among his supporters: the approximately 1,000,000 Chinese-identified people of Vietnam, the Hoa, who dominated much of the economy. Diệm issued an executive order which barred "foreigners", including Chinese, from 11 kinds of businesses, and demanded the half-million Vietnamese-born Hoa men, "Vietnamize", including changing their names to a Vietnamese form. His vice-president, Nguyễn Ngọc Thơ, was put in charge of the program.

2 November

Farmers in Nghệ An, Ho Chi Minh's native province, presented a petition to the International Control Commission protesting North Vietnam's land reform program. Violence spread throughout the province. The 325th Division of the People's Army of Vietnam put down the uprising and restored order. Approximately 1,000 protesters were killed, and another 5,000 were deported.

8 November

The North Vietnamese government officially shut down the Peoples Agricultural Reform Tribunals, which are believed to have been responsible for executing 10,000–15,000 North Vietnamese landowners and imprisoning or deporting another 50,000–100,000.

== December ==
18 December

Ho Chi Minh's government banned "subversive" publications and cracked down on intellectuals in North Vietnam.

31 December

The total number of U.S. military personnel in South Vietnam totaled 692. South Vietnam estimated there were 4,300 VC cadres and guerrillas in the country.
