= Richard Fitzgibbon =

Richard Fitzgibbon may refer to:

- Richard FitzGibbon, 3rd Earl of Clare (1793–1864), Irish politician and noble
- Richard B. Fitzgibbon Jr. (1920–1956), American soldier
