= War in Vietnam (1959–1963) =

Phase of the war between North and South Vietnam

- Part of the Vietnam War, the Indochina Wars and the Cold War
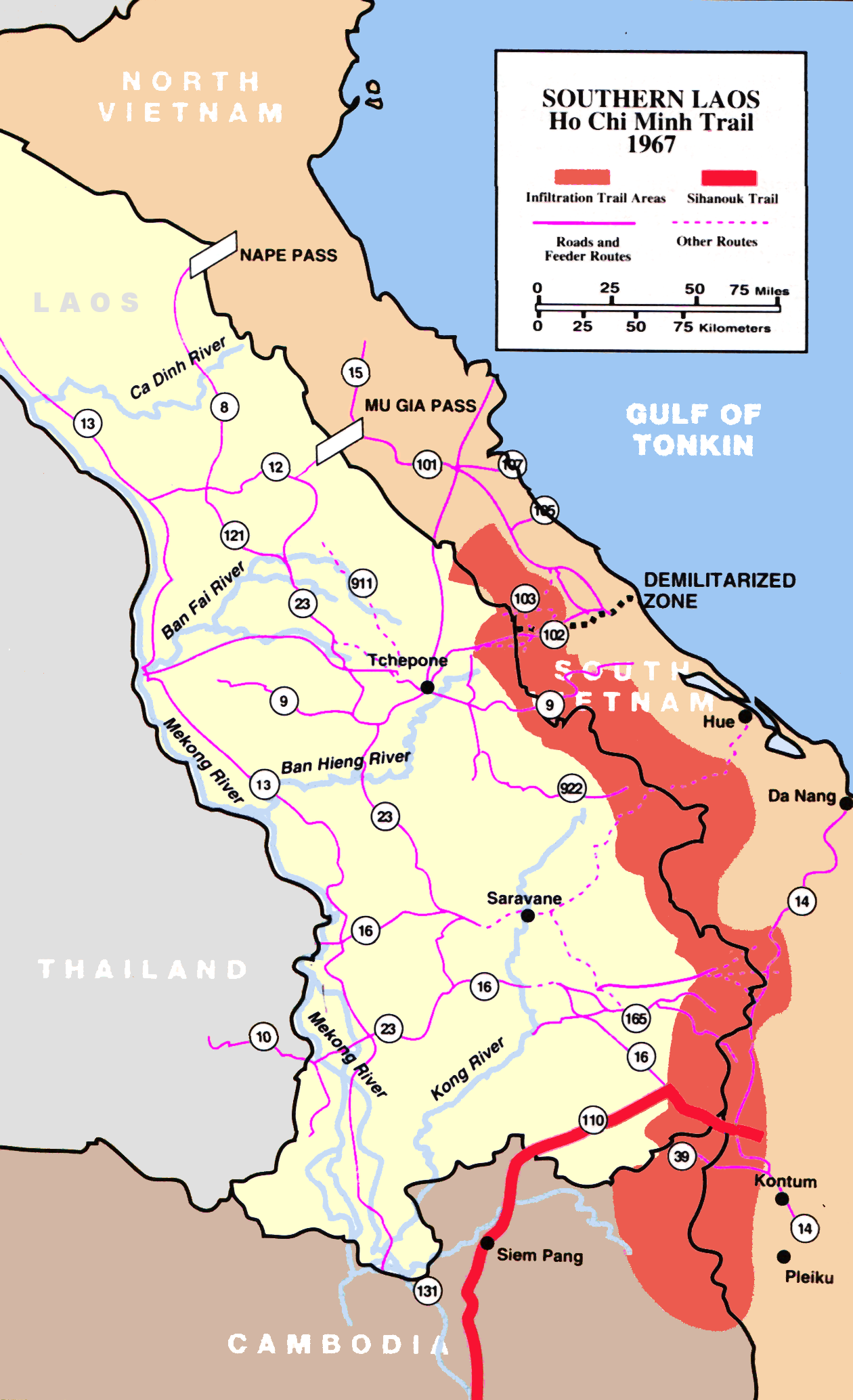
- The Ho Chi Minh trail was used to supply the Viet Cong.
Date	1959–1963
Location	North Vietnam, South Vietnam
Result	Americanization of the Vietnam War; Foundation of the National Liberation Front (Viet Cong); Anti-Buddhism in South Vietnam; Strategic Hamlet Program to combat the communist insurgency by means of population transfer of its supporters; Large Buddhist revolt; Arrest and assassination of Ngô Đình Diệm; Dương Văn Minh succeeds Diệm as president

Belligerents
Anti-Communist forces: South Vietnam; United States; Australia	Communist forces: North Vietnam (Provisional Revolutionary Government of the Republic of South Vietnam) Viet Cong; China; Supported by: Soviet Union

Commanders and leaders
(South Vietnam) Ngô Đình Diệm X (South Vietnam) Lâm Quang Thi (United States) Dwight D. Eisenhower (United States) John F. Kennedy X	(North Vietnam) Hồ Chí Minh (North Vietnam) Lê Duẩn (North Vietnam) Trường Chinh (North Vietnam) Nguyễn Chí Thanh

Casualties and losses
United States: 186 killed	

The 1959 to 1963 phase of the Vietnam War started after the North Vietnamese had made a firm decision to commit to a military intervention in the guerrilla war in South Vietnam, a buildup phase began, between the 1959 North Vietnamese decision and the Gulf of Tonkin Incident, which led to a major US escalation of its involvement. Vietnamese communists saw this as a second phase of their revolution, the US now substituting for the French.

Between the Geneva accords in 1954 and 1956, the two states created by the talks were still forming; the influence of major powers, especially France and the United States, and to a lesser extent China and the Soviet Union, were as much an influence as any internal matters. There is little question that in 1957–1958, there was a definite early guerrilla movement against the Diệm government, involving individual assassinations, expropriations, recruiting, shadow government. The insurgents were South Vietnamese rebels or northerners who had been living there for some time. While there was clearly communications and perhaps arms supply from the north, there is little evidence of any Northern units in the South, although organizers may well have infiltrated.

There was endemic insurgency in South Vietnam throughout the period 1954–1960. It can also be established – but less surely – that the Diệm regime alienated itself from one after another of those domestic sectors which might have offered it political support, and was grievously at fault in its rural programs. That these conditions engendered animosity toward the Southern dictatorship seems almost certain, and they could have led to a major resistance movement even without North Vietnamese help.

There is little doubt that there was some kind of Viet Minh-derived "stay behind" organization between 1954 and 1960, but it is unclear whether they were directed to take over action until 1957 or later. Before that, they were unquestionably recruiting and preparing.

While the visible guerrilla incidents increased gradually, the key policy decisions by the North were made in 1959. Early in this period, there was a greater degree of conflict in Laos than in South Vietnam. US combat involvement was, at first, greater in Laos, but the activity of advisors, and increasingly US direct support to South Vietnamese soldiers, increased, under US military authority, in late 1959 and early 1960. Communications intercepts in 1959, for example, confirmed the start of the Ho Chi Minh trail and other preparation for large-scale fighting. North Vietnam declared its public support for communist insurgents in South Vietnam. The communist forces in South Vietnam established the National Front for the Liberation of South Vietnam (Viet Cong). At the same time, the United States helped the South Vietnamese regime conduct its war strategy. Despite this assistance, the communist forces still won on the battlefield, fighting several large campaigns next to the big cities. Diệm was unable to take control of political crisis and was overthrown by the Council of Revolutionary Military (some documents of both sides suggest that it was the United States which had given the green light for this coup). After several years of chaos, the Ngô Đình Diệm government came to an end in 1963 and South Vietnam then fell into management crisis.

== Competing strategies ==
In April 1959, a branch of the Lao Động (Worker's Party of Vietnam), of which Ho Chi Minh became Secretary-General in 1956, was formed in the South, and communist underground activity increased. Some of the 90,000 Viet Minh troops that had returned to the North following the Geneva Agreements had begun filtering back into the South to take up leadership positions in the insurgency apparat. Mass demonstrations, punctuated by an occasional raid on an isolated post, were the major activities in the initial stage of this insurgency. Communist-led uprisings launched in 1959 in the lower Mekong Delta and Central Highlands resulted in the establishment of liberated zones, including an area of nearly fifty villages in Quảng Ngãi Province. In areas under communist control in 1959, the guerrillas established their own government, levied taxes, trained troops, built defense works, and provided education and medical care. In order to direct and coordinate the new policies in the South, it was necessary to revamp the party leadership apparatus and form a new united front group.

North Vietnam committed, in May 1959, to war in the South; this was confirmed by communications intelligence. Diệm, well before that point, had constantly pushed a generic anticommunism, but how much of this was considered a real threat, and how much a nucleus around which he justified his controls, is less clear. Those controls, and the shutdown of most indigenous opposition by 1959, were clearly alienating the Diệm government from significant parts of the Southern population. The government was massively mismanaging rural reforms and overemphasizing its power base in the cities, which might have had an independent rebellion. North Vietnam, however, clearly began to exploit that alienation. The US, however, did not recognize a significant threat, even with such information as intelligence on the formation of the logistics structure for infiltration. The presentation of hard evidence — communications intelligence about the organization building the Ho Chi Minh trail — of Hanoi's involvement in the developing strife became evident. Not until 1960, however, did the US recognize both Diệm was in danger, that the Diệm structure was inadequate to deal with the problems, and present the first "Counterinsurgency Plan for Vietnam (CIP)"

=== Republic of Vietnam strategy ===
Quite separate from its internal problems, South Vietnam faced an unusual military challenge. On the one hand, there was a threat of a conventional, cross-border strike from the North, reminiscent of the Korean War. In the fifties, the U.S. advisors focused on building a "mirror image" of the U.S. Army, designed to meet and defeat a conventional invasion.

Diệm (and his successors) were primarily interested in using the Army of the Republic of Vietnam (ARVN) as a device to secure power, rather than as a tool to unify the nation and defeat their enemies. Province and District Chiefs in the rural areas were usually military officers, but reported to political leadership in Saigon rather than the military operational chain of command. The 1960 "Counterinsurgency Plan for Vietnam (CIP)" from the U.S. Military Assistance Advisory Group (MAAG) was a proposal to change what appeared to be a dysfunctional structure. Further analysis showed the situation was not only a jockeying for power, but also reflected that the province chiefs indeed had security authority that could conflict with that of tactical military operations in progress, but also had responsibility for the civil administration of the province. That civil administration function became more and more intertwined, starting in 1964 and with acceleration in 1966, of the "other war" of rural development.

An issue that remains unclear is whether or not any of the post-Diệm governments seriously explored a neutralist solution through direct negotiations with Hanoi, which would have been against U.S. policy. Contemporary intelligence analyses discount such negotiations, although they remained an undercurrent; Robert McNamara's 1999 book says that "Big" Minh, the leader of the coup that actually overthrew Diệm, was actively exploring such an approach without informing the U.S.

Throughout this period, there clearly was a lack of information about South Vietnamese motivations. Analyses by the Bureau of Intelligence and Research (INR) of the U.S. Department of State define the political problems from a viewpoint different from that of the military. They described the immediate post-coup government, controlled by the popular "Big" Minh with Nguyen Ngoc Tho as figurehead Prime Minister, unable to get control, and the Khánh-led military junta that replaced him simply being a period of instability.

INR saw the priority during this period as more a matter of establishing a viable, sustainable political structure for South Vietnam, rather than radically improving the short-term security situation. It saw the Minh-Tho government as enjoying an initial period of popular support as it removed some of the most disliked aspects of the Diệm government. During this time, the increase in VC attacks was largely coincidental; they were resulting from the VC having reached a level of offensive capability rather than capitalizing on the overthrow of Diệm.

Contrary to the INR analysis, Douglas Pike said that there was a substantial defection from the NLF after the overthrow of Diệm, especially among Cao Đài that had considered themselves as especially persecuted by Diệm. Pike believed that a portion of the NLF was variously anti-Diệm, or simply in search of political power, rather than Communist. When this part left, the NLF came much more closely under Hanoi's control.

During this period, INR observed, in a December 23 paper, the U.S. needed to reexamine its strategy focused on the Strategic Hamlet Program, since it was getting much more accurate — if pessimistic — from the new government than it had from Diệm. Secretary McNamara, however, testified to the House Armed Services Committee, on December 27, that only a maximum effort of American power could salvage the situation. Two days later, the Minh-Tho government was overthrown.

INR looked pessimistically at Khánh, who claimed that Minh had been making overtures to Hanoi for a neutralist settlement. It was the contemporary assessment of INR that Minh had been making no such overtures, although this is contradicted by Secretary McNamara's 1999 book.

Whether or not Khánh was right about Minh's plan, INR judged Minh as motivated primarily by personal ambition. Where Minh had tried to form a government of technicians, Khánh, admittedly with U.S. urging, brought in political elements, which quickly led to factionalism not present under Minh's period of good will. INR saw Khánh as having a contradictory policy in terms of U.S. goals: while he did increase security, he did so by means judged counterproductive in broadening the political base of the government.

INR considered new student demonstrations, in April 1964, as the first warning of a new wave of protest, which became more manifest in August. Those demonstrations contained anti-American messages, but INR was uncertain if they represented true anti-Americanism, or simply opposition to American support of Khánh. As opposed to Diệm's catastrophic handling of the Buddhist crisis, Khánh responded with moderation, and, on August 28, INR concluded he was, in fact, improving the political situation. Evidence cited including the dissolution, in the next two weeks, of Minh's military triumvirate and Minh's election as chairman of a new Provisional Steering Committee, as well as release of some jailed generals that had supported Minh. INR suggested that Khánh may have caused the unrest by supporting the genuinely popular Khánh. Khánh, however, promptly sent Minh to exile in Thailand.

Note that Minh was exiled within the same month as the Gulf of Tonkin incident, with its obvious ramifications of increased U.S. involvement.

=== Communist strategy ===
The North had clearly defined political objectives, and a grand strategy, involving military, diplomatic, covert action and psychological operations to achieve those objectives. Whether or not one agreed with those objectives, there was a clear relationship between long-term goals and short-term actions. Its military first focused on guerrilla and raid warfare in the south (i.e., Mao's "Phase I"), simultaneously improving the air defenses of the north. By the mid-sixties, they were operating in battalion and larger military formations that would remain in contact as long as the correlation of forces was to their advantage, and then retreat — Mao's "Phase II".

In the Viet Cong, and in the North Vietnamese regular army (PAVN), every unit had political and military cadre to ensure đấu tranh was carried out.

Guerrilla attacks increased in the early 1960s, at the same time as the new John F. Kennedy administration made Presidential decisions to increase its influence. Diệm, as other powers were deciding their policies, was clearly facing disorganized attacks and internal political dissent. There were unquestioned conflicts between the government, dominated by minority Northern Catholics, and both the majority Buddhists and minorities such as the Montagnards, Cao Đài, and Hòa Hảo. These conflicts were exploited, initially at the level of propaganda and recruiting, by stay-behind Viet Minh receiving orders from the North.

== Events ==
=== 1959 ===
Diệm, in early 1959, felt under attack and broadly reacted against all forms of opposition, which was presented as a "Communist Denunciation Campaign", as well as some significant and unwelcome rural resettlement, the latter to be distinguished from land reform.

==== Increased activity in Laos ====
In May, the North Vietnamese made the commitment to an armed overthrow of the South, creating the 559th Transportation Group, named after the creation date, to operate the land route that became known as the Ho Chi Minh Trail. Additional transportation groups were created for maritime supply to the South: Group 759 ran sea-based operations, while Group 959 supplied the Pathet Lao by land routes. Group 959 also provided secure communications to the Pathet Lao.

The Pathet Lao were operating not only against the Laotian government, but also working with NVA Group 959 to supply the southern insurgency; much of the original Trail was in Laos, first supplying the Pathet Lao. Nevertheless, the Laotian government did not want it known that it was being assisted by the US in the Laotian Civil War against the Pathet Lao. U.S. military assistance could also be considered a violation of the Geneva agreement, although North Vietnam, and its suppliers, were equally in violation.

In July, the CIA sent a unit of United States Army Special Forces, who arrived on CIA proprietary airline Air America, wearing civilian clothes and having no obvious US connection. These soldiers led Miao and Hmong tribesmen against Communist forces. The covert program was called Operation Hotfoot. At the US Embassy, BG John Heintges was called the head of the "Program Evaluation Office."

The CIA directed Air America in August 1959 to train two helicopter pilots. Originally, this was believed to be a short-term requirement, but "this would be the beginning of a major rotary-wing operation in Laos.

==== Escalation and response in the South ====
Cause and effect are unclear, but it is also accurate that the individual and small group actions, by the latter part of 1959, included raids by irregulars in battalion strength.

The situation in Vietnam formed a significant part of the agenda of the U.S. Pacific commanders' conference in April. Lieutenant General Samuel T. Williams, chief of the MAAG cited the key concerns as:

- absence of a national plan for control of the situation
- no rotation of military units in the field
- the need for a central surveillance plan
- the proliferation of Ranger-type counterinsurgency units without central direction and without a civil-military context
- inadequate intelligence
- inadequate military communications
- lack of centralized direction of the war effort.

LTG Williams pointed to the dual chain of command of the ARVN, as distinct from the Civil Guard. The latter was commanded by the Department of the Interior, and controlled by province and district chiefs. This structure let the U.S. Operations Mission (USOM, the contemporary term for non-military foreign aid from the Agency for International Development) financially aid the Guard, they were so dispersed that there could be no systematic advice, much less to the combination of Guard and Army.

Under the authority of the commander of United States Pacific Command, it was ordered that MAAG-V assign advisors to the infantry regiment and special troops regiment level, who were not to participate directly in combat, and advisers be provided down to infantry regiment and to artillery, armored, and separate Marine battalion level. This move would enable advisers to give on-the-spot advice and effectively assess the result of the advisory effort. He also requested US Army Special Forces (SF) mobile training teams (MTT) to assist in training ARVN units in counterinsurgency.

On 8 July, the MAAG-V headquarters at Biên Hòa was raided by the Viet Cong; two South Vietnamese guards were killed along with two advisors, Major Dale R. Buis and Master Sergeant Chester M. Ovnand. These were the first American battle deaths in the Vietnam War.

==== Structural barriers to effectiveness of RVN forces ====
When the MAAG was instructed to improve the effectiveness of the ARVN, the most fundamental problem was that the Diệm government had organized the military and paramilitary forces not for effectiveness, but for political control and patronage. The most obvious manifestation of Diệm's goal was that there were two parallel organizations, the regular military under the Department of National Defense and the local defense forces under the Ministry of the Interior. Diệm was the only person who could give orders to both.

===== Command and control =====
Diệm appointed the Secretary of State for National Defense and the Minister of the Interior. The Defense Secretary directed of General Staff chief and several special sub-departments. The General staff chief, in turn, commanded the Joint General Staff (JGS), which was both the top-level staff and the top of the military chain of command.

There were problems with the military structure, even before considering the paramilitary forces under the Interior Ministry. The JGS itself had conflicting components with no clear authority. For example, support for the Air Force came both from a Director of Air Technical Service and a Deputy Chief of Air Staff for Matériel. The Director was, in principle, under the Chief of Staff, but actually reported to the Director General of Administration, Budget, and Comptroller for fiscal matters.

Combat units also had conflicting chains of command. A division commander might receive orders both from the corps-level tactical commander who actually carried out the operational art role of corps commanders in most militaries, but also from the regional commander of the home base of the division — even if the division was operating in another area. The chiefs of branches of service (e.g., infantry, artillery), who in most armies were responsible only for preparation and training of personnel of their branch, and orders only before they were deployed, would give direct operational orders to units in the field.

Diệm himself, who had no significant military background, could be the worst micromanager of all, getting on a radio in the garden of the Presidential Palace, and issuing orders to regiments, bypassing the Department of National Defense, Joint General Staff, operational commanders, and division commanders. He also consciously played subordinates against one another to avoid the formation of opposition; the Battle of Ap Bac was a defeat caused by a lack of unity of command, with conflicts between the military commander and province chief.

"The Department of National Defense and most of the central organizations and the ministerial services were located in downtown Saigon, while the General Staff (minus air and navy elements) was inefficiently located in a series of company-size troop barracks on the edge of the city. The chief of the General Staff was thus removed several miles from the Department of National Defense. The navy and air staffs were also separately located in downtown Saigon. With such a physical layout, staff action and decision-making was unduly delayed on even the simplest of matters.

"The over-all ministerial structure described above was originally set up by the French and slightly modified by presidential decree on 3 October 1957. Military Assistance Advisory Group, Vietnam, had proposed a different command structure which would have placed the ministry and the "general staff" in closer proximity both physically and in command relationship." Diệm, however, made a practice of keeping individuals or small groups from having too much authority.

The chain of command of both the Civil Guard and Self-Defense Corps, went from the Ministry of the Interior to the province chiefs, district chiefs, and village councils. Even though the province chiefs and district chiefs were often military officers, commanders of ARVN units operating in a province or district could not give orders to these units. Instead, they had to pass a request through military channels to the Ministry of Defense in Saigon. If the officials there agreed, they would convey the request to their counterparts in the Ministry of the Interior, who would then send orders down its chain of command to the local units.

===== Regular military =====
- Three corps headquarters and a special military district:
  - I Corps at Da Nang for the northern and central areas; the Central Highlands were separate
  - II Corps at Pleiku for the Central Highlands provinces
  - III Corps at Saigon for the southern part of the country
  - Saigon city special military district.
- Seven divisions of 10,450 men each
  - three infantry regiments
  - artillery battalion
  - mortar battalion
  - engineer battalion
  - company-size support elements
- Airborne group of five battalion groups
- four armored cavalry "regiments" (approximately the equivalent of a U.S. Army cavalry squadron)
  - one squadron (U.S. troop) of M24 light tanks
  - two squadrons of M8 self-propelled 75 mm howitzers
- Eight independent artillery battalions with U.S. 105 mm, and 155 mm pieces.

===== Local defense forces =====
Created by presidential decree in April 1955, and originally under the direct control of President Diệm, with control passed to the Ministry of the Interior in September 1958, the Civil Guard was made up of wartime paramilitary veterans. Its major duty was to relieve the ARVN of static security missions, freeing it for mobile operations, with additional responsibility for local intelligence collection and counterintelligence. In 1956, it had 68,000 men organized into companies and platoons. The Civil Guard was represented by two to eight companies in each province. It had a centrally controlled reserve of eight mobile battalions of 500 men each.

Operating on a local basis since 1955 and formally created in 1956, the Self-Defense corps was a village-level police organization, for protection against intimidation and subversion. It put units of 4–10 men into villages of 1,000 or more residents. In 1956, it had 48,000 non-uniformed troops armed with French weapons. The Self-Defense Corps, like the Civil Guard, was established to free regular forces from internal security duties by providing a police organization at village level to protect the population from subversion and intimidation.

The Civil Guard and the Self-Defense Corps were poorly trained and ill-equipped to perform their missions, and by 1959 their numbers had declined to about 46,000 and 40,000, respectively.

=== 1960 ===
As mentioned in the introduction to this section, the U.S. was urging the RVN to revise its parallel province/district command and military operations command structure; the Counterinsurgency Plan (CIP) was the first of several such proposals.

==== Laotian operations ====
After the initial 180-day assignment phase of the Special Forces personnel in Laos, the name of the operation changed to Operation White Star, commanded by Colonel Arthur "Bull" Simons.

==== Beginning of Phase II raids ====
On 25 January 1960, a Communist force of 300 to 500 men escalated with a direct raid on an ARVN base at Tây Ninh, killing 23 soldiers and taking large quantities of munitions. Four days later, a guerrilla group seized a town for several hours, and stole cash from a French citizen. These were still in the first Maoist stage, as raids rather than hit-and-run battles. Still, larger guerrilla forces broke lines of communications within areas of South Vietnam.

There was uncertainty, expressed by Bernard Fall and in a March U.S. intelligence assessment, that there were distinct plans to conduct larger-scale operations "under the flag of the People's Liberation Movement", which was identified as "red, with a blue star." It was uncertain if their intent was to continue to build bases in the Mekong Delta, or to isolate Saigon. The Pentagon Papers stated the guerrillas were establishing three options, of which they could exercise one or more;

1. incite an ARVN revolt
2. set up a popular front government in the lower Delta
3. force the GVN into such repressive countermeasures that popular uprisings will follow.

==== South Vietnam corruption breeds discontent ====
In April 1960, eighteen distinguished nationalists in South Vietnam sent a petition to President Diệm advocating that he reform his rigid, family-run, and increasingly corrupt government. Diệm ignored their advice and instead closed several opposition newspapers and had journalists and intellectuals arrested. On 5 May 1960, MAAG strength was increased from 327 to 685 personnel.

==== Formation of the NLF ====
In December, the National Front for the Liberation of South Vietnam (NLF) formally declared its existence, although it did not hold its first full congress until 1962.

The NLF platform recognized some of the internal stresses under the Diệm government, and put language in its platform to create autonomous regions in minority areas and for the abolition of the "U.S.–Diêm clique's present policy of ill-treatment and forced assimilation of the minority nationalities". Such zones, with a sense of identity although certainly not political autonomy, did exist in the North. In the early 1960s, NLF political organizers went to the Montagnard areas in the Central Highlands, and worked both to increase alienation from the government and directly recruit supporters.

=== 1961: Slow U.S. engagement ===
Not surprisingly, with a change in U.S. administration, there were changes in policy, and also continuations of some existing activities. There were changes in outlook. Defense Secretary Robert S. McNamara (in office 1961–68) told President John F. Kennedy (in office 1961–63) in 1961 that it was "absurd to think that a nation of 20 million people can be subverted by 15–20 thousand active guerrillas if the government and the people of that country do not wish to be subverted." McNamara, a manufacturing executive and expert in statistical management, had no background in guerrilla warfare or other than Western culture, and rejected advice from area specialists and military officers. He preferred to consult with his personal team, often called the "Whiz Kids"; his key foreign policy advisor was a law professor, John McNaughton, while economist Alain Enthoven was perhaps his closest colleague.

Still trying to resolve the problems of GVN conflicting command, a new reorganizational proposal, the "Geographically Phased Plan", was offered. Its goal was to have a coherent national plan, which was, in 1962, to be expressed as the Strategic Hamlet Program.

==== Kennedy pushes for covert operations against the North ====
On January 28, 1961, shortly after his inauguration, John F. Kennedy told a National Security Council meeting that he wanted covert operations launched against North Vietnam, in retaliation for their equivalent actions in the South. It is not suggested that this was an inappropriate decision, but the existence of covert operations against the North, has to be understood in analyzing later events, especially the Gulf of Tonkin Incident.

Even earlier, he issued National Security Action Memorandum (NSAM) 2, directing the military to prepare counterinsurgency forces, although not yet targeting the North.

Kennedy discovered that little had progressed by mid-March, and issued National Security Action Memorandum (NSAM) 28, ordering the CIA to launch guerrilla operations against the North. Herbert Weisshart, deputy chief of the Saigon CIA station, observed the actual CIA action plan was "very modest". Given the Presidential priority, Weisshart said it was modest because William Colby, then Saigon station chief, said it would consume too many resources needed in the South. He further directed, in April, a presidential task force to draft a "Program of Action for Vietnam".

In April, the Bay of Pigs invasion of Cuba, under the CIA, had failed, and Kennedy lost confidence in the CIA's paramilitary operations. Kennedy himself had some responsibility for largely cutting the Joint Chiefs of Staff out of operational planning. The JCS believed the operation was ill-advised, but, if it was to be done, American air support was essential. Kennedy, however, had made a number of changes to create plausible deniability, only allowing limited air strikes by CIA-sponsored pilots acting as Cuban dissidents. After it was learned that the main strike had left behind few jet aircraft, he refused a follow-up strike; those aircraft savaged the poorly organized amphibious ships and their propeller-driven air support.

The U.S. Air Force, however, responded to NSAM 2 by creating, on April 14, 1961, the 4400th Combat Crew Training Squadron (CCTS), code named "Jungle Jim." The unit, of about 350 men, had 16 C-47 transports, eight B-26 bombers, and eight T-28 trainers (equipped for ground attack), with an official mission of training indigenous air forces in counterinsurgency and conducting air operations. A volunteer unit, they would deploy in October, to begin Farm Gate missions.

The task force reported back in May, with a glum assessment of the situation in the South, and a wide-ranging but general plan of action, which became NSAM 52. In June, Kennedy issued a set of NSAMs transferring paramilitary operations to the Department of Defense. These transfers of responsibility should be considered not only in respect to the specific operations against the North, but also to the level of covert military operation in the South in the upcoming months. This transfer also cut the experienced MG Edward Lansdale out of the process, as while he was a U.S. Air Force officer, the military saw him as belonging to CIA.

==== Intelligence support ====
Also in May, the first U.S. signals intelligence unit, from the Army Security Agency under National Security Agency control, entered Vietnam operating under the cover name "3rd Radio Research Unit". Organizationally, it provided support to MAAG-V, and trained ARVN personnel, the latter within security constraints. The general policy, throughout the war, was that ARVN intelligence personnel were not given access above the collateral SECRET (i.e., with no access to material with the additional special restrictions of "code word" communications intelligence (CCO or SI).

Their principal initial responsibility was direction finding of Viet Cong radio transmitters, which they started doing from vehicles equipped with sensors. On December 22, 1961, an Army Security Agency soldier, SP4 James T. Davis, was killed in an ambush leading an ARVN squad on one of these direction finding missions. After Johnson became President of the United States several years later, he referred to Davis in a speech as the first American killed in Vietnam; in reality, there had been fifteen battle deaths before Davis.

==== Covert U.S. air support enters the South ====
More U.S. personnel, officially designated as advisors, arrived in the South and took an increasingly active, although covert, role. In October, a U.S. Air Force special operations squadron, part of the 4400th CCTS, deployed to SVN, officially in a role of advising and training. The aircraft were painted in South Vietnamese colors, and the aircrew wore uniforms without insignia and without U.S. ID. Sending military forces to South Vietnam was a violation of the Geneva Accords of 1954, and the U.S. wanted plausible deniability.

The deployment package consisted of 155 airmen, eight T-28s, and four modified and redesignated SC-47s and subsequently received B-26s. U.S. personnel flew combat as long as a VNAF person was aboard. FARM GATE stayed covert until after the Gulf of Tonkin incident.

==== Building the South Vietnamese Civil Irregular Defense Groups ====
Under the operational control of the Central Intelligence Agency, initial U.S. Army Special Forces involvement came in October, with the Rade people of southern Vietnam. The Civilian Irregular Defense Groups (CIDG) were under CIA operational control until July 1, 1963, when MACV took over. Army documents refer to control by "CAS Saigon", a cover name for the CIA station. According to Kelly, the SF and CIA rationale for establishing the CIDG program with the Montagnards was that minority participation would broaden the GVN counterinsurgency program, but, more critically,

the Montagnards and other minority groups were prime targets for Communist propaganda, partly because of their dissatisfaction with the Vietnamese government, and it was important to prevent the Viet Cong from recruiting them and taking complete control of their large and strategic land holdings.

It was in mid-November when Kennedy decided to have U.S. operatives take on operational as well as advisory roles. Under U.S. terms, a Military Assistance Advisory Group (MAAG), such as the senior U.S. military organization in Vietnam, is a support and advisory organization. A Military Assistance Command (MAC) is designed to carry out MAAG duties, but also to direct command combat troops. There was considerable discussion about the reporting structure of this of the organization: a separate theater reporting to the National Command Authority or part of United States Pacific Command.

==== First Honolulu Conference ====
After meetings in Vietnam by GEN Taylor, the Secretaries of State and Defense issued a set of recommendations, on November 11. Kennedy accepted all except the use of large U.S. combat forces.

McNamara held the first Honolulu Conference, at United States Pacific Command headquarters, with the Vietnam commanders present. He addressed short-term possibilities, urging concentration on stabilizing one province: "I'll guarantee it (the money and equipment) provided you have a plan based on one province. Take one place, sweep it and hold it in a plan." Or, put another way, let us demonstrate that in some place, in some way, we can achieve demonstrable gains.

==== First U.S. direct support to an ARVN combat operation ====
On 11 December 1961 the United States aircraft carrier USNS Card docked in downtown Saigon with 32 U. S. Army H-21 helicopters and 400 men, organized into two Transportation Companies (Light Helicopter); Army aviation had not yet become a separate branch.

Twelve days later these helicopters were committed into the first airmobile combat action in Vietnam, Operation Chopper. It was the first time U.S. forces directly and overtly supported ARVN units in combat, although the American forces did not directly attack the guerrillas. Approximately 1,000 Vietnamese paratroopers were airlifted into a suspected Viet Cong headquarters complex about ten miles west of the Vietnamese capital, achieving tactical surprise and capturing a radio station.

=== 1962: Getting in deeper ===
From the U.S. perspective, the Strategic Hamlet Program was the consensus approach to pacifying the countryside. There was a sense, however, that this was simply not a high priority for Diệm, who considered his power base to be in the cities. The Communists, willing to fill a vacuum, became more and more active in rural areas where the GVN was invisible, irrelevant, or actively a hindrance.

==== Special Forces operations ====
In 1962, the U.S. Military Assistance Command–Vietnam (MACV) established Army Special Forces camps near villages. The Americans wanted a military presence there to block the infiltration of enemy forces from Laos, to provide a base for launching patrols into Laos to monitor the Ho Chi Minh Trail, and to serve as a western anchor for defense along the DMZ. These defended villages were not part of the Strategic Hamlet Program, but did provide examples that were relevant.

==== U.S. ground command structure established ====
U.S. command structures continued to emerge. On February 8, Paul D. Harkins, then Deputy Commanding General, U.S. Army Pacific, under Pacific Command, was promoted to general and assigned to command the new Military Assistance Command, Vietnam (MAC-V).

Military Assistance Command-Thailand was created on May 15, 1962, but reported to Harkins at MAC-V. In a departure from usual practice, the MAAG was retained as an organization subordinate to MAC-V, rather than being absorbed into it. The MAAG continued to command U.S. advisors and direct support to the ARVN. At first, MAC-V delegated control of U.S. combat units to the MAAG. While it was not an immediate concern, MAC-V never controlled all the Air Force and Navy units that would operate in Vietnam, but from outside its borders. These remained under the control of Pacific Command, or, in some cases, the Strategic Air Command.

No regular ARVN units were under the command of U.S. military commanders, although there were exceptions for irregular units under Special Forces. Indeed, there could be situations where, in a joint operation, U.S. combat troops were under a U.S. commander, while the ARVN units were under an ARVN officer with a U.S. advisor. Relationships in particular operations often were more a matter of personalities and politics rather than ideal command. U.S. troops also did not report to ARVN officers; while many RVN officers had their post through political connections, others would have been outstanding commanders in any army.

At the same time, the U.S. was beginning to explore withdrawing forces.

==== Intelligence support refines ====
The USMC 1st Composite Radio Company deployed, on January 2, 1962, to Pleiku, South Vietnam as Detachment One. After Davis' death in December, it became obvious to the Army Security Agency that thick jungle made tactical ground collection exceptionally dangerous, and direction-finding moved principally to aircraft platforms.

==== Additional allied support ====
In addition to the U.S. advisers, in August 1962, 30 Australian Army advisers was sent to Vietnam to operate within the United States military advisory system. As with most American advisors, their initial orders were to train, but not go on operations.

== 1963 ==
1963 was a critical year not only because the Diệm government fell, but also because the North, at the end of the year, chose a more aggressive military strategy.

Stability in the South, however, would not improve with increasing dissent, coup attempts, and a major coup. It remains unclear as to what extent the South Vietnamese were exploring solutions based on a neutralist Vietnam, but this apparently existed at some level, without U.S. knowledge.

=== Organizations and personnel ===
Organizations and commands would change with time. In January, for example, Major General Trần Văn Đôn became Commander-in-Chief of the RVN armed forces, GEN William Westmoreland was named deputy to GEN Paul Harkins to replace him later. In a structural reorganization, the ARVN made the Saigon Special Region the III Corps tactical zone; the former III Corps for the Mekong Delta became IV Corps tactical zone

=== January 1963: Question of ARVN effectiveness ===
South Vietnamese forces, with U.S. advisors, took severe defeats at the Battle of Ap Bac in January, and the Battle of Go Cong in September. This has been considered the trigger for an increasingly skeptical, although small, American press corps in Vietnam. Ap Bac was of particular political sensitivity, as John Paul Vann, a highly visible American officer, was the advisor, and the U.S. press took note of what he considered to be ARVN shortcomings.

While the Buddhist crisis and military coup that ended with the killing of Diệm was an obvious major event, it was by no means the only important event of the year. In keeping with the President's expressed desires, covert operations against the North were escalated. Of course, the assassination of Kennedy himself brought Lyndon B. Johnson into office, with a different philosophy toward the war. Kennedy was an activist, but had a sense of unconventional warfare and geopolitics, and, as is seen in the documentary record, discussed policy development with a wide range of advisors, specifically including military leaders although he distrusted the Joint Chiefs of Staff. He was attracted to officers that he saw as activist and unconventional, such as Edward Lansdale.

Johnson tended to view the situation from the standpoint of U.S. domestic policy, and did not want to render himself vulnerable to political criticism as the man who had "lost Vietnam". Early after becoming president, as he told Bill Moyers, he had the "terrible feeling that something has grabbed me by the ankles and won't let go." His response was to send Robert McNamara to examine the situation and reassure him. McNamara at this point, as he had with Kennedy, exuded a sense of logical control; he was not yet in the deep despair that led him to write, "...we were wrong, terribly wrong. We owe it to future generations to explain why."

"Johnson was a profoundly insecure man who craved and demanded affirmation." When the North Vietnamese did not respond as Johnson wanted, he took it personally, and may have made some judgments based on his emotional responses to Ho. He also spoke with a much smaller advisory circle than Kennedy, and excluded active military officers.

==== The Buddhist crisis begins ====
While there had been long-standing animosity between Diệm and the Buddhists, in April 1963, for unclear reasons, the central government ordered the provincial authorities to enforce a ban on the display of all religious flags. This ban was rarely enforced, but, since the order went out shortly before the major festival, Vesak (informally called Buddha's Birthday), which fell on May 8, many Buddhists perceived this as a direct attack on their customs.

In May, a government paramilitary unit fired into demonstrators. As part of a wave of protests, a Buddhist monk immolated himself; photographs of his body, apparently seated calmly in the lotus position as he burned to death, drew worldwide attention. By early June, the government was negotiating with the Buddhists as it had never done, with Vice President Nguyen Ngoc Tho, a Buddhist, apparently being an effective negotiator in spite of Diệm's brother and political advisor Ngô Đình Nhu's announcing "if the Buddhists want to have another barbecue, I will be glad to supply the gasoline".

==== May 1963 Honolulu conference; covert warfare a major issue ====
At the May 6 Honolulu conference, the decision was made to increase, as the President had been pushing, covert operations against the North. A detailed plan for covert operations, Pacific Command Operations Plan 34A (OPPLAN 34A) went to GEN Taylor, now Chairman of the Joint Chiefs of Staff, who did not approve it until September 9. Shultz suggests the delay had three aspects:

1. Washington was preoccupied with the Buddhist crisis
2. MACV had no established covert operations force, so even if he approved a plan, there was no one to execute it
3. Taylor, although a distinguished Airborne (paratroopers once being believed special operators) officer, disagreed with Kennedy's emphasis on covert operations, did not have the appropriate resources in the Department of Defense, and he did not believe it was a proper job for soldiers.
4. Diệm, fighting for survival, was not interested

It is unclear if Taylor did not believe covert operations should not be attempted at all, or if he regarded it as a CIA mission. If the latter, Kennedy would have been unlikely to support him, given the President's loss of confidence after the Bay of Pigs invasion fiasco.

==== Interim government ====
Diệm was overthrown on November 1 and killed the next day.

Secretary of State Dean Rusk counseled a delay in meeting with the coup leadership, which had started calling itself the "Revolutionary Committee", to avoid appearance of it being a U.S. coup. Apparently unknown to the U.S., the plotters had negotiated, beforehand, with vice-president Tho, who had been the chief government negotiator in the Buddhist crisis. In the immediate followup of the coup, Diệm's cabinet were told to resign, and there were no reprisals. Tho, however, was negotiating with the committee, especially the most powerful general, Dương Văn Minh knowing that the military leaders wanted him in the new civilian government.

Generals Đôn, Chief of Staff, and Lê Văn Kim, his deputy, called at the US Embassy, Saigon, on November 3. Explaining that Minh was, as they spoke, with Tho, they said there would be a two-tiered government structure with a military committee presided over by General Dương Văn Minh overseeing a regular cabinet that would be mostly civilian with Tho as prime minister.

On the 4th, ambassador Henry Cabot Lodge and his liaison to the coup plotters Lucien Conein met with Generals Minh and Don. Afterwards, Lodge reported, "Minh seemed tired and somewhat frazzled; obviously a good, well-intentioned man. Will he be strong enough to get on top of things?" The new government was announced on the 6th: General Minh was chairman, Don and Dinh were deputy chairmen, and nine other generals, including Kim, Khiêm, "little" Minh, Chieu, and Thieu were members. General Nguyễn Khánh, the commander of II Corps tactical zone in central Vietnam, was not in the government.

==== After two assassinations ====
Kennedy and Diệm both died in November 1963. Lyndon Johnson became the new President of the United States. Johnson was far more focused on domestic politics than the international activist, Kennedy. Some of the Kennedy team left quickly, while others, sometimes surprisingly given extremely different personalities, stayed on; the formal and logical Robert McNamara quickly bonded with the emotional and deal-making Johnson.

McNamara was insistent that a rational enemy would not accept the massive casualties that indeed were inflicted on the Communists. The enemy, however, was willing to accept those casualties. McNamara was insistent that the enemy would comply with his concepts of cost-effectiveness, of which Ho and Giap were unaware. They were, however, quite familiar with attritional strategies. While they were not politically Maoist, they were also well versed in Mao's concepts of protracted war.

Three things concerned the U.S.:

1. How stable was the new government? Was the presence of an empowered Tho a threat to Minh and the other generals?
2. The economy was in tatters, partially due to the suspension of aid as a lever on Diệm
3. Statistical indicators showed that VC attacks were increased in comparison with the first half of the year, and MACV was concerned that units involved in the coup were not getting back to the field.

US dissatisfaction with indigenous efforts led to "Americanization" of the war.
