= 1957 in the Vietnam War =

← 1956 1958 →
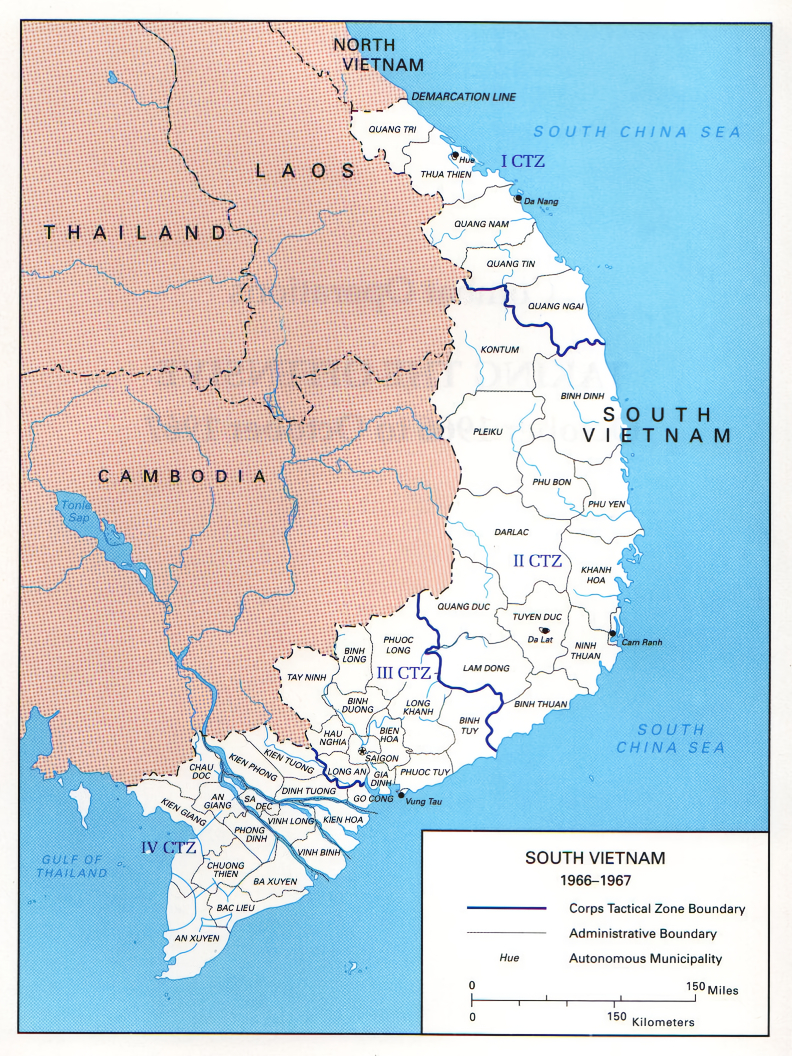
- A map of South Vietnam showing provincial boundaries and names and military zones (1, II, III, and IV Corps).
Location	Indochina

Belligerents
South Vietnam	Anti-government insurgents: (Vietnam) Viet Minh cadres

In 1957 South Vietnam's President Ngô Đình Diệm visited the United States and was acclaimed a "miracle man' who had saved one-half of Vietnam from communism. However, in the latter part of the year, violent incidents committed by anti-Diệm insurgents increased and doubts about the viability of Diệm's government were expressed in the media and by U.S. government officials.

The term "Viet Cong" for the communist cadres in South Vietnam began to replace the older term "Viet Minh" in common usage.

== January ==
The military budget for the government of South Vietnam in 1957 was projected to total $207 million, of which $187 million would come from the United States. Seventy percent of the U.S. assistance was spent paying the salaries of South Vietnamese armed forces.

An author in Foreign Affairs wrote "South Vietnam today is a quasi-police state characterized by arbitrary arrests and imprisonments, strict censorship of the press and the absence of an effective political opposition."

3 January

The International Control Commission, formed to administer the Geneva Accords of 1954, said that neither North or South Vietnam had been in compliance with the agreement.

== February ==
22 February

When Diệm delivered a speech at an agricultural fair in Buôn Ma Thuột, a communist cadre named Hà Minh Tri attempted to assassinate him by firing a pistol from close range, but missed, hitting the Secretary for Agrarian Reform's left arm. The weapon jammed and security overpowered Tri before he was able to fire another shot.

== April ==
30 April

A CIA National Intelligence Estimate said that the Viet Cong (VC) in South Vietnam numbered 5,000 to 8,000 and along with about 2,000 armed members of the Cao Đài and Hòa Hảo sects were "widely dispersed and probably not capable of more than local harassment of government forces and local populations."

== May ==
The Civil Police Administration project of Michigan State University surveyed the police and paramilitary resources of South Vietnam. The para-military Civil Guard (CG) had 54,000 members and was responsible for patrolling rural areas and maintaining law and order. The Self Defense Corps (SDC) with about 50,000 members was a militia force to protect villages from subversive activities. These two organizations were poorly equipped, trained, and disciplined, especially the SDC whose "capability to withstand assaults by armed and organized VC units is virtually nil." In addition, in many areas the SDC was infiltrated by the communists.

2 May

The new U.S. Ambassador in South Vietnam, Elbridge Durbrow warned the Department of State that Diệm had "become more intolerant of dissenting opinions" and that he relied "heavily on a small circle of advisers including members of his family."

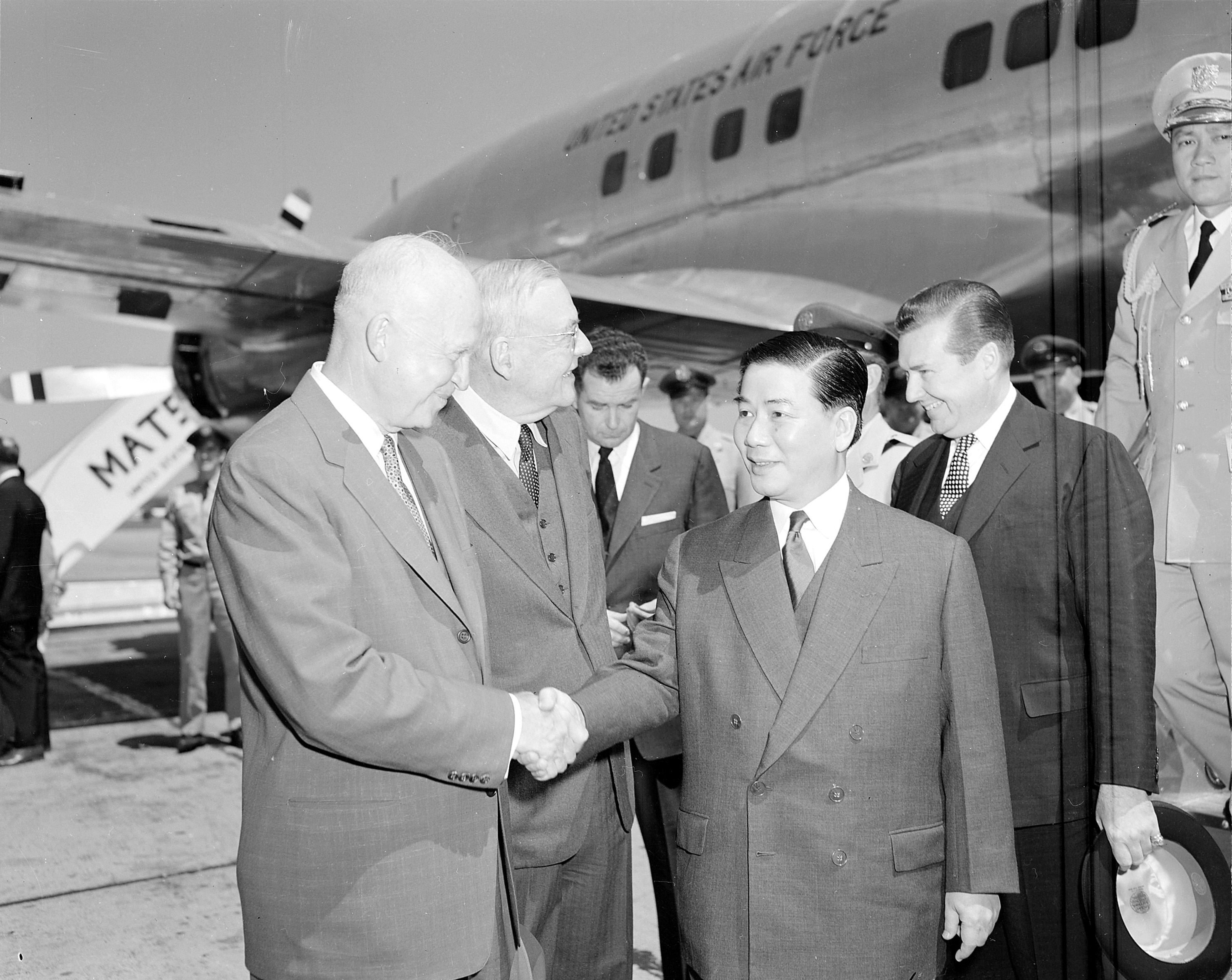
(left to right) President Eisenhower and Secretary of State John Foster Dulles greet President Diệm on his arrival in Washington.

8 May

On an official visit to the United States, Diệm arrived at noon on May 8 at the National Airport in Washington, D.C. aboard the plane of U.S. President Dwight D. Eisenhower, the Columbine III, a silver Lockheed Constellation. Diệm was received at the airport by Eisenhower, Secretary of State John Foster Dulles and Chairman of the Joint Chiefs of Staff Nathan Twining. It was only the second time that Eisenhower had greeted a visitor at the airport.

9 May

Diệm addressed the United States Congress and received a standing ovation.

12 May

Diệm was accorded a ticker tape parade in New York City and acclaimed by Mayor Robert Wagner as "a man history may yet adjudge as one of the great figures of the twentieth century."

13 May

Life Magazine called Diệm "The Tough Miracle Man of Vietnam." He was similarly lauded in other U.S. publications.

19 May

Diệm departed the United States to return to South Vietnam. This date was also Ho Chi Minh's birthday.

24 May

The number of U.S. military personnel in South Vietnam was increased from 692 to 736, the great majority being assigned to the Military Assistance Advisory Group (MAAG).

== June ==
Lê Duẩn, Secretary General of the Communist Party in North Vietnam, wrote a report advocating for North Vietnam to do more to support the communists, now commonly called the Viet Cong, in South Vietnam while continuing to focus on building a socialist society in the North.

24 June

The United States Army Special Forces, established the Commando Training Center in the city of Nha Trang and began teaching commando and counter-insurgency tactics to members of the South Vietnamese military to better combat the VC.

== July ==
11 July

The relative peace in South Vietnam during the past year was broken when anti-government dissidents killed 17 people in a bar in the Châu Đốc massacre. The massacre was attributed to remnants of the Hòa Hảo religious sect which had been repressed by Diệm in 1955 and 1956. The killings were the beginning of a low level campaign targeting government officials, school teachers, and village chief's families.

15 July

South Vietnam's ambitious land reform program had only distributed 35,700 hectares (88,000 acres) to 18,800 farmers during nearly two years of operation. This compared with nearly 1,000,000 hectares (2,500,000 acres) of land estimated to be available for redistribution.

== September ==
2–9 September

The Ngô Đình Diệm presidential visit to Australia.

14 September

The District Chief of Mỹ Tho Province and his family were assassinated.

== October ==
10 October

A bomb was thrown into a Saigon restaurant and injured 13 people.

21 October

Major Harry Griffith Cramer Jr., an American army officer, was killed by a bomb near Nha Trang, South Vietnam.

22 October

Thirteen American soldiers were injured in three attacks aimed at MAAG and United States Information Service installations in Saigon.

31 October

The South Vietnamese communist insurgents operating within the Mekong River Delta organize themselves into 37 companies.

== November ==
25 November

An article by David Hotham in The New Republic said that "We should not suppose that the Communists have done nothing because Diệm has been in power" but "rather than Diệm has remained in power because the Communists have done nothing." The Diệm government, he said, was not democratic; there was no freedom of the press; and the regime was propped up by American aid.

== December ==
Russian and Chinese ministers Nikita Khrushchev and Zhou Enlai decided that South and North Vietnam should be regarded as separate countries and each have a seat at the United Nations. This prompted the North Vietnam government to consider a military solution to unite North and South Vietnam.

During the last three months of 1957, 190 terrorist attacks and clashes between government security forces and insurgents were reported in South Vietnam. Seventy-four people were killed including 20 government officials and 31 police and military personnel.

5 December

Ambassador Durbrow in Saigon reported to the Department of State that Diệm's focus on security and repression of opposition to his rule was alienating the people of South Vietnam and facilitating the growth of communism.

10 December

General Samuel Williams, the head of MAAG in South Vietnam responded to Ambassador Durbrow. "There are no indications of a resumption of large-scale guerrilla war at this date", he said. The VC "lack sufficient strength, do not have a popular base and are faced with a central government whose efficiency to deal with the subversion threat has gradually improved."

17 December

A Saigon newspaper highlighted the growing violence in the countryside of South Vietnam: "Today the menace is greater than ever, with the terrorists no longer limiting themselves to the notables in charge of security. Everything suits them, village chiefs, chairmen of liaison committees, simple guards, even former notables...In certain areas the village chiefs spend their nights in the security posts, while the inhabitants organize watches."

31 December

In 1957, the anti-communist campaigns of the Diệm government decimated the communists in South Vietnam. 2,000 suspected communist party members and sympathizers were killed and 65,000 were arrested. Communist party membership in South Vietnam was 5,000 in mid-1957 and had been reduced to one-third that by the end of the year. According to a North Vietnamese historian, 1957 was "the darkest period" for the communist movement in South Vietnam.
