= Hank Cramer =

American singer

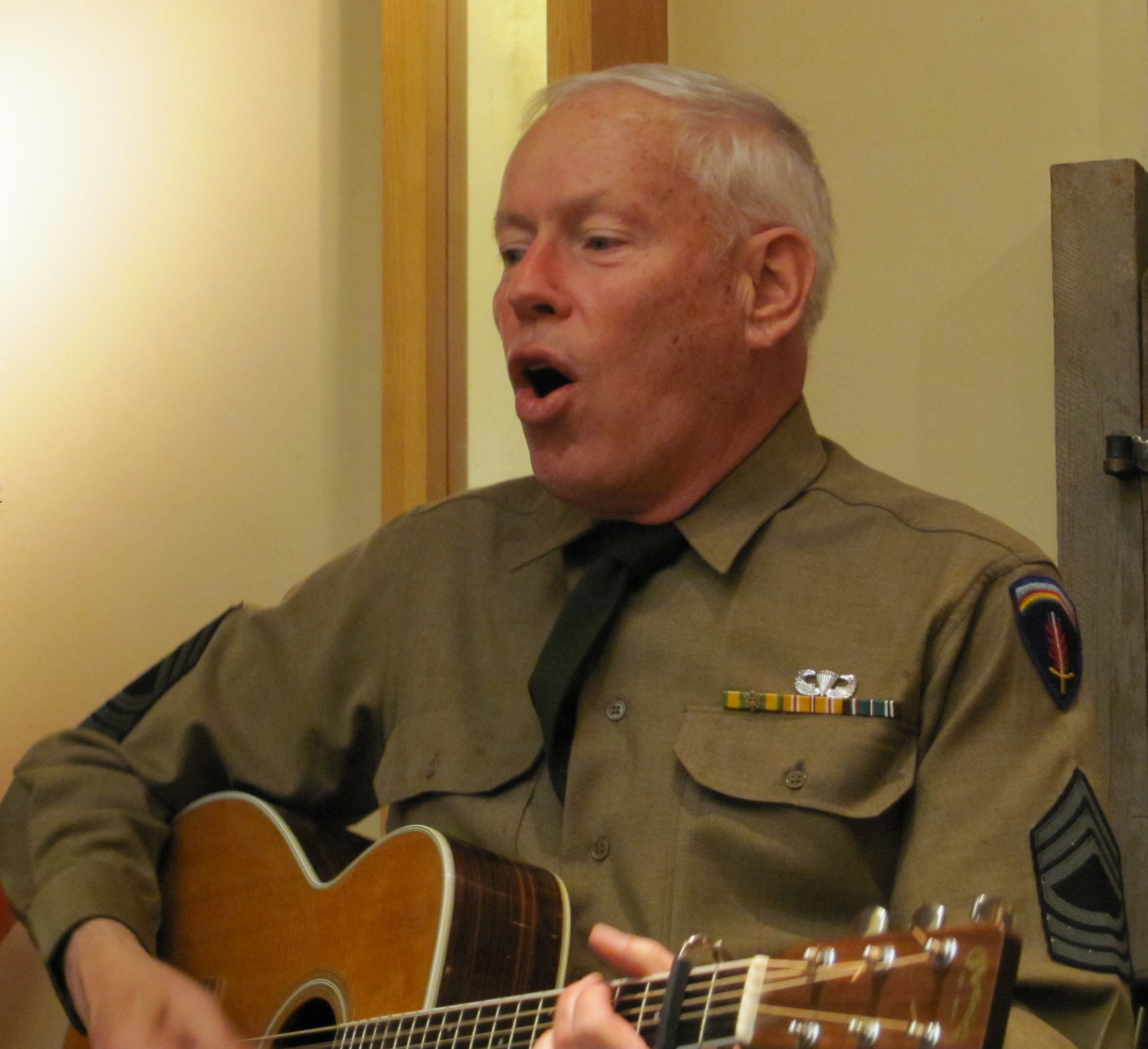
- Cramer in 2011

Background information
- Genres: Country music; folk; sea shanty; Celtic
- Occupation: Musician
- Instruments: Guitar; vocals; banjo
- Years active: 1982–present
- Labels: Ferryboat; Skookumchuck; Front Range
- Website: www.hankcramer.com

Hank Cramer is an American folk singer from the Pacific Northwest.

== Biography ==
Cramer. born Harry Griffith Cramer III, is the son of a United States Army officer Harry Griffith Cramer Jr. who served in the United States Army Special Forces, making the ultimate sacrifice on a classified mission in SE Asia and Anne Charmonte Supple. Cramer began singing as a student at the University of Arizona. Cramer served in the United States Army for 28 years, retiring at the rank of lieutenant colonel. As a Career Special Forces officer and Military Historian he presents podcasts; for example, on "The Witness to War Channel" on YouTube.

In 2006, Cramer revived the annual Pine Stump Symphony in the Methow Valley of Washington, a music event run by his late father-in-law Ron McLean from 1962 until his death in 1982.

In 2011 Cramer received the Humanities Washington Award for his for the Humanities Washington Speakers Bureau presentation "One Trail, Many Voices: Songs of the Oregon Trail".

Combining both music and history shows up in Cramer's history events including WWII Reunions, U.S.S. Constellation, and Fort Laramie, Wyoming appearances.

More recently Cramer was featured on KSPS PBS (Inland Washington State and Edmonton/Calgary, Alberta, Canada) in an "Inland Sessions on February 25, 2025". Publicly viewable on YouTube

== Discography ==
- The Captain & The Outlaw (1982) – Hank Cramer with Dakota – Front Range Records
- Victory Sings At Sea (1989) cassette & CD
- West By Northwest (1996) – Skookumchuck Music
- The Curse of the Somers (1997) (CD & Movie Soundtrack
- The Cutters: Live Aboard The Wawona (1998) – Hank Cramer with The Cutters – Skookumchuck Music
- Days Gone By (1999) – Ferryboat Music
- The Cutters: Sail Away (2000) – Hank Cramer with The Cutters – Skookumchuck Music
- The Rounders: Brave Boys! (2001) – Hank Cramer with The Rounders – Ferryboat Music
- Letters To The Wall (2001) Movie Soundtrack
- The Road Rolls On (2003) – Ferryboat Music
- Songs from the USS Constellation (2003) – Hank Cramer & Constellation's Crew – Ferryboat Music
- If There's One More Song (2004) – Ferryboat Music
- A Soldier's Songs (2005) – Ferryboat Music
- Back to Sea (2006) – Hank Cramer & Constellation's Crew – CD/DVD combo Ferryboat Music
- Songs From Maurie's Porch (2006) – Ferryboat Music
- Soundtrack to USS Constellation Visitor Center video (2007) -Hank Cramer & Constellation's Crew – Ferryboat Music
- Miner's Songs (2007) – Ferryboat Music
- Way Out West (2007) – Ferryboat Music
- Pine Stump Symphony (2007) DVD Music Video
- Horses (2007) DVD Music Video
- Caledonia (2008) – Ferryboat Music
- An Old Striped Shirt (2008) – Ferryboat Music
- Open Range (2008)- Ferryboat Music
- The Shantyman (2008) – Ferryboat Music
- Loosely Celtic (2009) – Ferryboat Music
- With Respect to Farming (2009) Movie Soundtrack
- The Witch of the Westmorland (2010) YouTube Video
- You Just Can't See Him From The Road (2010) YouTube Video
- My Side of the Mountains (2012) – Ferryboat Music
- Make the Rafters Ring (2016) - Ferryboat Music
- Sing Until Morning (2019) with Dan Maher - Ferryboat Music
- Westward I Go Free (2022) Hank Cramer & Friends - Ferryboat Music
