= 1959 Biên Hòa compound raid =

Part of the Vietnam War (1959)

MAAG Compound Raid
- Part of the Vietnam War
| Date | 8 July 1959 |
| Location | Biên Hòa, South Vietnam |
| Result | Viet Cong victory |

Belligerents
| Viet Cong | United States; South Vietnam |

Strength
| 6 guerillas | 6 advisors 3 South Vietnamese guards |

Casualties and losses
| 1 killed | (United States) American: 2 killed; 1 wounded; (South Vietnam) South Vietnamese: 2 killed |
- Civilian: 1 wounded

On 8 July 1959, six Viet Cong guerrillas attacked a Military Assistance Advisory Group (MAAG) compound in Biên Hòa, a town about 20 miles (32 km) northeast of Saigon. Major Dale R. Buis (visiting from MAAG 5) and Master Sergeant Chester M. Ovnand (MAAG 7) would be among the first Americans killed in the Vietnam War. Two South Vietnamese guards were killed by the guerrillas. After the incident, MAAG personnel began carrying weapons.

== Raid ==
The Viet Cong attacked the mess hall, where six MAAG advisers were watching the film The Tattered Dress. Ovnand was about to switch to the next reel when VC guerrillas poked their weapons through the windows and sprayed the room with automatic weapons fire. Several 9mm rounds were fired at Ovnand. He quickly turned off the lights and went to the top of the stairs, where he was able to turn on the exterior flood lights. On the stairs, he died from his wounds. Buis was crawling towards the kitchen doors at the time. Buis saw the attacker coming through the kitchen doors when the exterior flood lights were switched on. He stood up and charged at the attacker, but was only able to cover 15 feet (4.6 m) before being fatally struck from behind. The attacker, who was about to throw his satchel charge through the door, was startled by his actions and this hesitation resulted in him blowing himself up. The Viet Cong also killed two South Vietnamese guards who were on duty that night. Captain Howard Boston (MAAG 7) and the Vietnamese cook's eight-year-old son were among those injured.
