= Chester M. Ovnand =

United States Army soldier (1914–1959)

Chester Melvin Ovnand
- Born: September 8, 1914 Thief River Falls, Minnesota, U.S.
- Died: July 8, 1959 (aged 44) Biên Hòa, South Vietnam
- Allegiance: United States
- Branch: United States Army
- Rank: Master Sergeant
- Conflicts: World War II; Korean War; Vietnam War; 1959 Biên Hòa compound raid

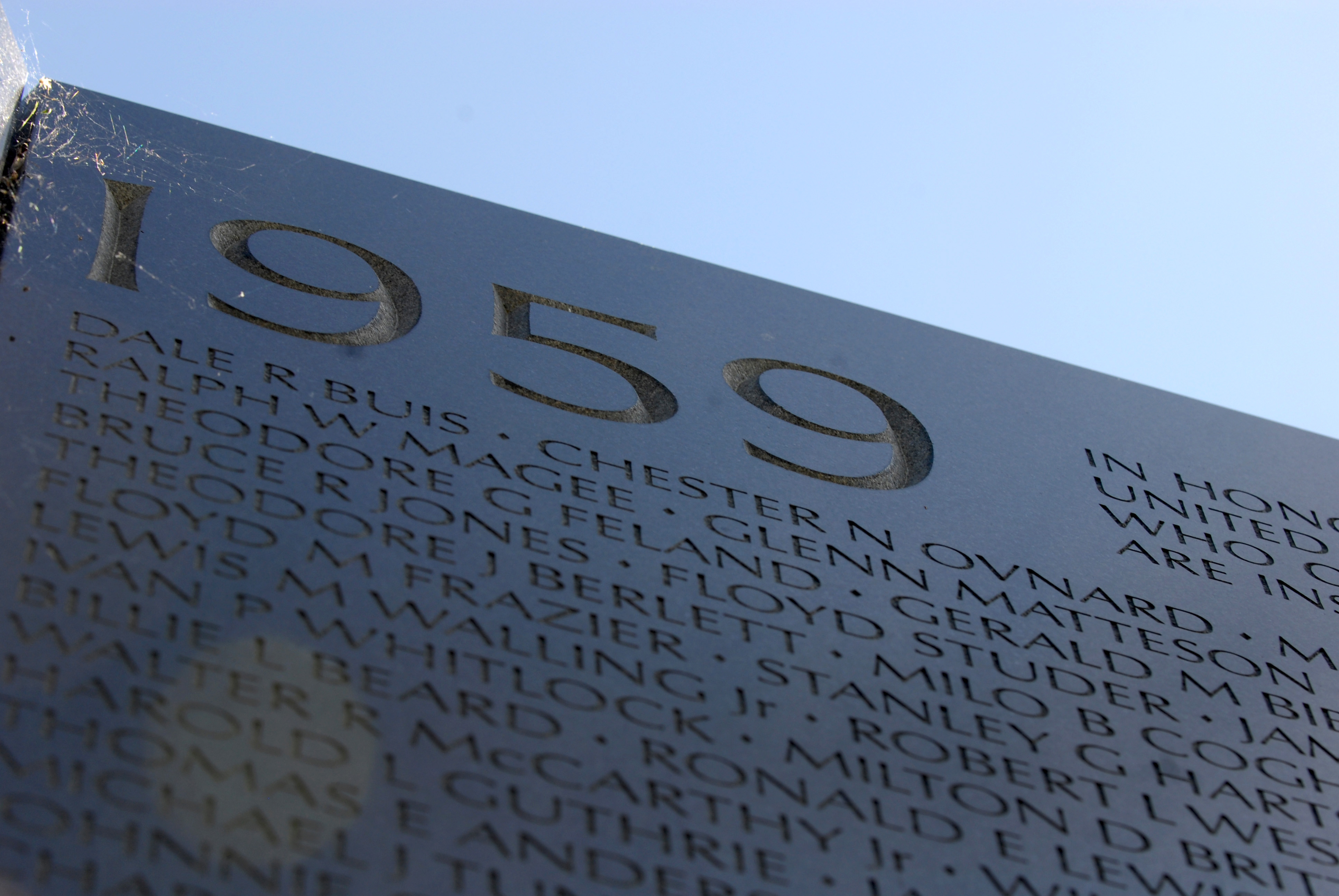
The names of U.S. Army M/Sgt Chester M. Ovnand and Maj. Dale R. Buis are inscribed on Panel 1E of the Vietnam War Memorial Wall

Master Sergeant Chester Melvin Ovnand (also known with surname Ovnard) (September 8, 1914 – July 8, 1959) was the first American casualty of the Vietnam War killed at the hands of the Viet Cong. His name is the second listed on the Vietnam Veterans Memorial.

== Life and career ==
Chester M. Ovnand (also called "Chet") was from Thief River Falls, Minnesota and was born to Engebret Ovnand and Maybelle Welch. Army records conflict as to what his actual name was—Charles Melvin Ovnand or Chester Melvin Ovnard—though that the latter appears on the Vietnam Veterans Memorial is possibly an indication of general consensus among the Memorial's planners.

On March 1, 1940, he and his wife Catherine Irene Reynard (June 1917 – November 1994) welcomed a daughter, Margret Ann Ovnand. Five years after her birth, Chester Ovnand left for Copperas Cove, Texas, where he met his second wife Mildred, who forbade him from making contact with his daughter. He returned once, when Margret was twelve, before leaving for war.

Ovnand served in World War II from 1943 to 1945, the Korean War from 1950 to 1953, and the Vietnam War from 1958 to 1959.

On July 8, 1959, Ovnand and Major Dale R. Buis (visiting from MAAG 5) were killed at Biên Hòa, 20 miles northeast of Saigon. He was part of the Military Assistance Advisory Group 7 sent to train the South Vietnamese army.

The Viet Cong attacked the mess hall where he and five officers were watching the movie The Tattered Dress. M/Sgt Ovnand switched on the lights to change to the next reel, when VC guerrillas poked their weapons through the windows and sprayed the room with automatic weapons fire. M/Sgt Ovnand was hit with several 9mm rounds. He immediately switched the lights off and headed to the top of the stairs, where he was able to turn on the exterior flood lights. He died from his wounds on the stairs. Major Buis, at that time, was crawling towards the kitchen doors. When the exterior flood lights came on, he must have seen an attacker coming through the kitchen doors. Buis got up and rushed towards the attacker, but was only able to cover 15 feet before being fatally hit from behind. His actions startled the attacker who was about to throw his satchel charge through the door. The attacker's satchel charge had already been activated and his moment of hesitation caused him to blow himself up. Two South Vietnamese guards who were on duty that night were also killed by the Viet Cong. The wounded were Captain Howard Boston (MAAG 7) and the Vietnamese cook's eight-year-old son.

== See also ==
- Dale R. Buis
- Harry Griffith Cramer Jr.
- Richard B. Fitzgibbon, Jr.
