= Jonathan Compas =

American football player (born 1986)

No. 61
- Position: Guard

Personal information
- Born: January 9, 1986 (age 40); Orange, California, U.S.
- Listed height: 6 ft 3 in (1.91 m)
- Listed weight: 283 lb (128 kg)

Career information
- High school: Carlsbad (Carlsbad, California)
- College: UC Davis
- NFL draft: 2009: undrafted

Career history
- Oakland Raiders (2009)*; Tampa Bay Buccaneers (2009-2010); New England Patriots (2011)*; Washington Redskins (2011)
- * Offseason or practice squad member only

Career NFL statistics
- Games played: 2
- Stats at Pro Football Reference

Jonathan Compas (born January 9, 1986) is an American former professional football player who was a center in the National Football League (NFL). He was signed by the Oakland Raiders as an undrafted free agent in 2009 after playing college football for the UC Davis Aggies.

Compas has also played for the Tampa Bay Buccaneers, New England Patriots, and Washington Redskins.

== Early life ==
Compas is the youngest of two children of Gerald and Linda Compas (née Fitzgibbon). He is the grandson of Richard B. Fitzgibbon, Jr. and nephew of Richard B. Fitzgibbon III.

== College career ==
After graduating from Carlsbad High School in 2004, Compas played football at the University of California, Davis. In 2004, he was redshirted and later selected as Scout Defense Player of the Week after the Northern Colorado game. The following year, he started the first six games as right guard, before being sidelined by injury. In 2006, he started all eleven games at right tackle and picked up one tackle (on an interception) early in the third quarter against cross town rival Sacramento State University. That same year he was an All-American pick by The Sporting News. Then in 2007, he earned second consecutive GWFC all-academic honors while managing to start eleven games.

== Professional career ==
Before his career with the Buccaneers, Compas signed with the Oakland Raiders as a free-agent in April 2009. On September 1, 2009, he was claimed off waivers from the Oakland Raiders by Tampa Bay. He was released by the Buccaneers on September 4, 2010. Following his release from the Buccaneers, Compas was picked up by the New England Patriots. Compas holds a masters degree from University of San Diego in business administration.
