= Charles McMahon and Darwin Judge =

Last two American servicemen killed in the Vietnam War

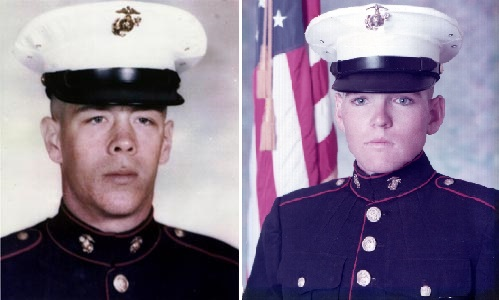
Charles McMahon (left) and Darwin Judge (right).

Charles McMahon (May 10, 1953 – April 29, 1975) and Darwin Lee Judge (February 16, 1956 – April 29, 1975) were the last two United States servicemen killed in Vietnam during the Vietnam War. The two men, both U.S. Marines, were killed in a rocket attack one day before the Fall of Saigon.

Charles McMahon, aged 21, was a corporal from Woburn, Massachusetts. Darwin Judge was a 19-year-old lance corporal and Eagle Scout from Marshalltown, Iowa.

== Deaths ==
McMahon and Judge were members of the Marine Security Guard (MSG) Battalion at the US Embassy, Saigon and were providing security for the DAO Compound, adjacent to Tân Sơn Nhứt Airport, Saigon. McMahon had arrived in Saigon on 18 April, while Judge had arrived in early March. Both died in a North Vietnamese rocket attack on Tân Sơn Nhứt on the morning of April 29, 1975.

In accordance with procedures for deceased Americans in Vietnam, their bodies were transferred to the Saigon Adventist Hospital, near Tan Son Nhut. In telephone calls to the hospital on the afternoon of April 29, the few remaining staff advised that the bodies had been evacuated; in fact the bodies were left behind. Operation Frequent Wind, the American evacuation of Saigon, was completed the following day, April 30, 1975. Senator Edward M. Kennedy of Massachusetts, through diplomatic channels, secured the return of the bodies the following year. The transfer of the bodies took place on February 22, 1976, at Tân Sơn Nhứt Airport to two of Kennedy's aides. Their caskets were loaded onto an Air France Caravelle jet chartered by the United Nations High Commissioner for Refugees and were flown to Bangkok to be received by a U.S. military honor guard and then transferred to U-Tapao Royal Thai Navy Airfield for identification. On February 26, 1976, the Central Identification Laboratory-Hawaii (CILH) identified the remains of both USMC Lance Corporal Darwin Lee Judge and USMC Corporal Charles McMahon, Jr., who were missing from the Vietnam War.

Judge was buried with full military honors in March 1976 in Marshalltown, Iowa. There was a flag draped coffin, a Marine Honor Guard, and a rifle firing salute. The flag that covered his coffin was folded and presented to his parents. His funeral was attended by the Daily Iowan (Iowa City, Iowa). Judge was given a second Marine burial honors 25 years later through planning by Douglas Potratz, USMC MSG who served with Judge in Saigon and Ken Locke, boyhood friend and fellow Eagle Scout; retired USMC Lieutenant Colonel Jim Kean, the commanding officer of the Marines during the Fall of Saigon, presented a flag to Judge's parents at a ceremony held at the Iowa Veteran's Home Vietnam War Memorial.

While McMahon and Judge were the last American ground casualties in Vietnam, they are not the last casualties of the Vietnam War (a term which also covers the U.S. involvement in Cambodia and Laos) recorded on the Vietnam Veterans Memorial; those names belong to the 18 Americans killed in the Mayaguez Incident.

== Memorials ==
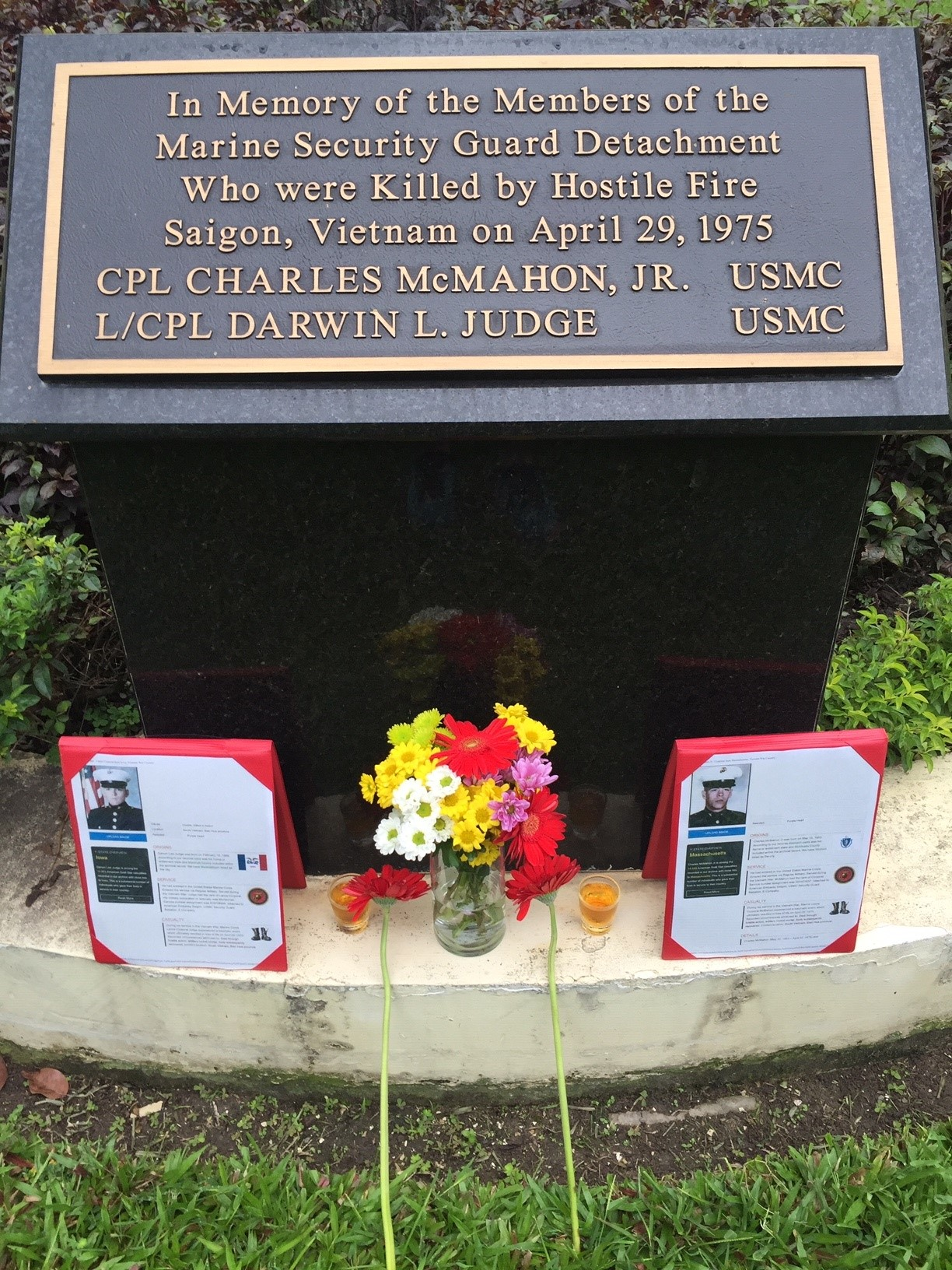
McMahon and Judge memorial plaque at US Consulate, Saigon

The Fall of Saigon Marines Association, a California non-profit, public-benefit corporation, was formed to honor the last two Marines to be killed in action in Vietnam. The association sponsors two $500 scholarships for Eagle Scouts attending Marshalltown High School in Marshalltown, Iowa (as a memorial to Eagle Scout Judge). A large color photo of Judge and plaque, is displayed near Marshalltown High School’s main entrance. A park in Marshalltown is named in his honor.

A memorial plaque was erected on a planter on the grounds of the US Consulate in Saigon (the former US embassy).

In July 2023 the Marine Corps Embassy Security Group building at Marine Corps Base Quantico was renamed the McMahon-Judge Annex.

== See also ==
- Vietnam War casualties
- Richard B. Fitzgibbon Jr. - first official U.S. casualty of the war
