= Dale R. Buis =

US Army officer (1921–1959)

Dale Richard Buis
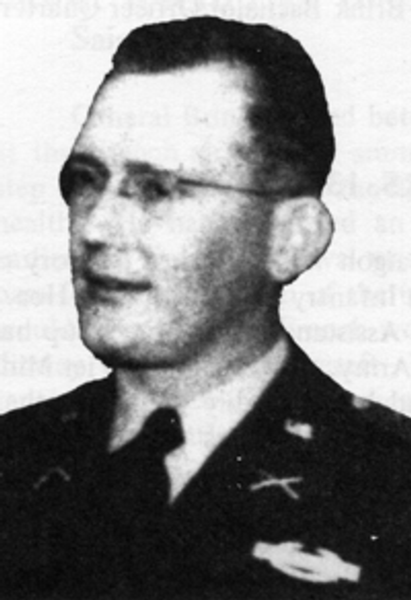
- Born: August 29, 1921; Pender, Nebraska, U.S.
- Died: July 8, 1959 (aged 37); Biên Hòa, South Vietnam
- Burial place: Fort Rosecrans National Cemetery
- Education: Wentworth Military Academy
- Military career
- Allegiance: United States of America
- Branch: United States Army
- Rank: Major
- Conflicts: World War II; Vietnam War; 1959 Biên Hòa compound raid

Dale Richard Buis (August 29, 1921 – July 8, 1959) was a United States Army officer. He was the second U.S. casualty of the Vietnam War, killed by the Vietcong. He is the first name listed on the Vietnam Veterans Memorial.

== Early life and education ==
Buis was born and raised in Pender, Nebraska, the son of Dr. John Buis, a physician, and his wife Serena (née Kundsen). He graduated from Wentworth Military Academy in Lexington, Missouri. He was part of the Military Assistance Advisory Group (MAAG) sent in 1955 to train South Vietnamese troops.

== Career ==
Buis was assigned to MAAG 5 in South Vietnam.

On 8 July 1959 he was visiting the MAAG 7 base at Biên Hòa, 20 miles (32 km) northeast of Saigon. Six Viet Cong (VC) attacked the mess hall where he and four other officers were watching the movie The Tattered Dress. Master sergeant Chester M. Ovnand, who was in charge of the projector, switched on the lights to change to the next reel, when VC guerrillas poked their weapons through the windows and sprayed the room with automatic weapons fire. Ovnand was hit with several 9mm rounds. He immediately switched the lights off and headed to the top of the stairs, where he was able to turn on the exterior flood lights. He died from his wounds on the stairs. Buis was crawling towards the kitchen doors. When the exterior flood lights came on, he must have seen an attacker coming through the kitchen doors. He got up and rushed towards the attacker, but was only able to cover 15 feet (4.6 m) before being fatally hit from behind. His actions startled the attacker who was about to throw his satchel charge through the door. The attacker's satchel charge had already been activated and his moment of hesitation allowed the satchel charge to explode, killing him. Two South Vietnamese guards that were on duty that night were also killed by the VC. The wounded included Captain Howard Boston (MAAG 7) and the South Vietnamese cook's eight-year-old son.

Buis is buried in Fort Rosecrans National Cemetery in San Diego.

== See also ==
- Harry Griffith Cramer Jr.
- Richard B. Fitzgibbon Jr.
- Chester M. Ovnand
