= Châu Đốc massacre =

1957 killings in South Vietnam

Chau Doc massacre
- Location: Châu Đốc town, An Giang Province of South Vietnam
- Date: July 11, 1957
- Target: Civilians in a town bar
- Attack type: Massacre
- Deaths: 17
- Perpetrator: Anti-government insurgents

The Châu Đốc massacre was the July 11, 1957 killing of 17 people in the small town of Châu Đốc in An Giang Province, near the border with Cambodia, in what was then known as South Vietnam. The killings were part of a low-level campaign targeting South Vietnamese officials.

== Background ==
Thousands of Viet Minh cadres had stayed behind after the country was split into North and South Vietnam. The North Vietnamese government maintained that a referendum on unification in line with the Geneva Accords would go ahead. As such, they forbade the southern Viet Minh cadres from anything but low-level insurgency actions, like the assassination of South Vietnamese Diệm officials instead of large scale military engagements. They were joined by other anti-government elements who escaped Diệm's crackdown on opposition groups like the Hòa Hảo and Cao Đài sects.

== Bar killings ==
As part of the violence against the Ngo Dinh Diem government, on July 11, 1957 anti-Diem insurgents stormed a bar in Châu Đốc and killed 17 people who were drinking inside. The victims were tied up and then machine gunned. American papers reported that the killings were a result of propaganda spread by communist forces and that the killing of 20 people would allow the person to fly and that anyone who killed 100 would "become an angel". The killings were blamed on communist insurgents and fighters of the banned Hòa Hảo sect. While urban Vietnamese did not take these claims seriously, the more rural a person was the more superstitious they were and the more likely they would believe that the murders would grant special powers.

== See also ==
- 1957 in the Vietnam War
- War Remnants Museum
