= Quỳnh Lưu uprising =

Failed 1956 revolt in North Vietnam

- Part of the Cold War
Date	November 2–22, 1956
Location	Quỳnh Lưu, Nghệ An, North Vietnam
Result	Uprising defeated

Belligerents
North Vietnamese government; (North Vietnam) People’s Army of Vietnam; 324th Division	Christian farmers

Commanders and leaders
(North Vietnam) Hồ Chí Minh; Phạm Văn Đồng; Trần Quốc Hoàn; Võ Nguyên Giáp	Local communities

Strength
2,000-3,000 soldiers	+20,000 rebels

Casualties and losses
Unknown	Estimated 1,000-6,000 killed, wounded or captured

The Quỳnh Lưu uprising (Vietnamese: Khởi-nghĩa Quỳnh-lưu 1956) was a rebellion against the government of the Democratic Republic of Vietnam (North Vietnam) in the rural Quỳnh Lưu district of Nghệ An province, from 2 to 22 November 1956, driven by dissatisfaction with both the land reform campaign and the failure of its subsequent correction process.

== History ==
=== Land reform ===
The DRV instituted their land reform program from 1953 to 1956, with the government's stated aims being to placate the peasant's hunger for land and break the power of the traditional village elite and gentry. However, the land reform was accompanied by large-scale repression and 'excesses' which led to popular resentment. In the Quỳnh Lưu area, locals had been discriminated against by local officials because of their opposition to the land reform and other reforms carried out by the government.

=== Communist prevention of emigration ===
According to the 1954 Geneva Accords, of which the DRV was signatory to, Vietnam was partitioned into two halves, with a Viet Minh-controlled Democratic Republic of Vietnam, and an anti-communist State of Vietnam (which would become South Vietnam) with Bao Dai as head of state. There would be a 300-day interim period prescribed by the accords, ending May 18, 1955, where people could relocate freely to 1 of the 2 Vietnams of their choosing before the border at the 17th parallel was sealed. However, in late 1954 and early 1955, along with counter-propaganda, the Viet Minh sought to prevent would-be refugees from leaving. As the American and French military personnel were only present in the major cities and at air bases and on the waterfront, the North tried to stop people from trying to leave through a military presence in the inland ruralside to interdict the flow of would-be refugees.

=== Uprising ===
On 2 November 1956, Catholic farmers approached the International Control Commission to express grievances and seek permission to migrate south. They then clashed with security forces and took officials hostage. By 5 November, protesters had occupied the headquarters of Quỳnh Yên commune, and the unrest spread across Quỳnh Lưu district.

On 13 November, tens of thousands of peasants, armed with farming tools and knives, surrounded Quỳnh Lưu town while displaying anti-government banners. The Hanoi authority deployed the 325th Division of the People's Army of Vietnam to suppress the uprising. The fighting caused about 1,000 casualties, and thousands of arrests. Government control was fully restored by 22 November 1956. The investigation found no evidence of external intervention.

== See also ==
- We Want to Live (1956 film)
