= Richard B. Fitzgibbon Jr. =

First American to die in the Vietnam War

Richard Bernard Fitzgibbon Jr.
- Born: June 21, 1920; Stoneham, Massachusetts, U.S.
- Died: June 8, 1956 (aged 35); Saigon, South Vietnam
- Military career
- Allegiance: United States of America
- Branch: United States Navy; United States Air Force
- Service years: 1942–1946 (USN); 1946–1956 (USAF)
- Rank: Technical Sergeant
- Conflicts: World War II; Vietnam War

Technical Sergeant Richard Bernard Fitzgibbon Jr., USAF (June 21, 1920 – June 8, 1956) was the first American to die in the Vietnam War. He was murdered by another American airman on June 8, 1956. Through the efforts of his sister Alice Fitzgibbon Rose DelRossi, a former Stoneham, Massachusetts, selectwoman, Fitzgibbon's name was added to the Vietnam War Memorial on Memorial Day in May 1999.

Following in his father's footsteps, Richard B. Fitzgibbon III joined the United States Marine Corps and also served in Vietnam, where he was killed in September 1965. The Fitzgibbons' deaths were the first of only three instances among all U.S. casualties in which both father and son were killed in the Vietnam War.

== Biography ==
Richard B. Fitzgibbon Jr. was born on June 21, 1920, in Stoneham, Massachusetts. Fitzgibbon was a veteran of the United States Navy, having served during World War II. After leaving the Navy, he joined the United States Air Force, rising through the ranks to become a Technical Sergeant. Fitzgibbon was serving as part of the Military Assistance Advisory Group (MAAG) (Detachment 1, 1173rd Foreign Mission Squadron), which was involved in training military personnel in South Vietnam.

Fitzgibbon was not killed in action, but rather was murdered in Saigon by another American airman, Staff Sergeant Edward C. Clarke. On the day he was shot, Fitzgibbon had apparently reprimanded Clarke for an incident on a flight that day. When Clarke went off duty, he began drinking heavily at a club at the base. When he exited the club, he saw Fitzgibbon across the street playing with some local children and giving out candy. Clarke drew his sidearm and shot Fitzgibbon several times. Clarke fled the shooting scene and exchanged fire with Vietnamese policemen who were chasing him. During the pursuit, Clarke jumped or fell to his death from a second-story balcony. Fitzgibbon died from his wounds on June 8, 1956.

== Recognition ==
For 43 years, Fitzgibbon's death was regarded by the United States government as too early to be classified as a Vietnam War casualty. The Department of Defense (DoD) directorate that handled the Vietnam Veterans Memorial originally started its database at January 1, 1961. This was because President Lyndon B. Johnson had declared in a speech that Army Security Agency technician Spec/4 James T. Davis, who died in a Viet Cong ambush near the village of Cau Xang on December 22, 1961, was "the first American killed in the resistance to aggression in Vietnam."

Fitzgibbon's family lobbied to have the start date changed, and their cause was taken up by U.S. Representative Ed Markey (D, 7th District, MA) of Malden, Massachusetts. After a high-level review by the DoD, the start date of the Vietnam Veterans Memorial was changed to November 1, 1955, the creation date of the Vietnam Military Assistance Advisory Group (MAAG). With this new date, Fitzgibbon became chronologically the first person to be listed on the memorial, preceding Harry Griffith Cramer Jr., Dale R. Buis and Chester M. Ovnand. Fitzgibbon's name was added to the Vietnam Memorial Wall on May 31, 1999, and Today Show host Katie Couric interviewed members of his family for the occasion.

The DoD had previously moved the date of the start of the Vietnam War to include the death of Captain Cramer, who was killed at Nha Trang in a training accident on October 21, 1957. His name was added to "The Wall" in 1983, after successful efforts by his son, Lt. Col. Harry G. Cramer III USAR, then an active-duty Army officer, to get DoD to acknowledge his father's death, as well as the presence of MAAG forces in Vietnam years prior to the officially recognized date of 1961. Lt. Col. Cramer asked that his father's name simply be added to the center (1E) stone, out of sequence, but it is still clearly listed in the chronological book at "The Wall" as 1957, not 1959. The Army conducted an official ceremony in October 2007 at the U.S. Military Academy at West Point, from which Capt. Cramer had graduated, to mark the 50th anniversary of the Army's first Vietnam casualty.

Although Fitzgibbon is chronologically the first casualty on the Vietnam Veterans Memorial Wall, he was not the first American to be killed in Vietnam. Lieutenant Colonel Albert Peter Dewey was mistakenly shot and killed during an ambush by Viet Minh troops on September 26, 1945, in the early aftermath of World War II.

== Family ==
One of Fitzgibbon's sons, Marine Lance Corporal Richard B. Fitzgibbon III (March 11, 1944 – September 7, 1965), was also killed in the Vietnam War while serving with the 1st Battalion, 4th Marines. Both father and son are interred at Blue Hill Cemetery in Braintree, Massachusetts.

He is survived by his wife Eunice Fitzgibbon Jackson and daughters Trudy McDermott and Linda Compas (whose son is American football player Jonathan Compas). Another son, Robert "Bobby" Fitzgibbon, died in April 2011.

Through Fitzgibbon's great-grandmother, Mary Coston Fitzgibbon, Fitzgibbon was third cousin to South African artist Jeremy Wafer.

== Documentary ==
In 1998–2000, ABC News and TLC co-produced a documentary series called Vietnam: The Soldiers' Story. The concluding episode, titled "Stories from the Wall", aired May 29, 2000, a year after Fitzgibbon's name was added to the Vietnam Memorial. The episode included a segment on the father and son.

== See also ==
- Charles McMahon and Darwin Judge – the last American ground casualties in Vietnam

== Bibliography ==
Notes

References

- DoD (November 6, 1998). "Name of Technical Sergeant Richard B. Fitzgibbon to be added to the Vietnam Veterans Memorial". Department of Defense (DoD). Archived from the original on May 29, 2010.
- FootNote.com (2010). "Richard B. Fitzgibbon Jr". National Archives and Records Administration. FootNote.com. Archived from the original on March 14, 2010.
- Hall, Billy (2009). Bulletproof: In Vietnam (2009 ed.). AuthorHouse. ISBN 978-1-4490-4227-1. - Total pages: 224
- Lawrence, A. T. (2009). Crucible Vietnam: Memoir of an Infantry Lieutenant (2009 ed.). McFarland. ISBN 978-0-7864-4517-2. - Total pages: 247
- NYT (September 28, 1945), "Indo-China rebels kill U.S. Officer; Slay Lieut. Col. A. Peter Dewey From Ambush", The New York Times, p. 1
- Petersen-Swift, Deborah (May 26, 2000). "Vietnam Documentary puts spotlight on family's losses". The Hartford Courant. p. A7. Archived from the original on 2012-03-02.
- Tovo, Ken (March 18, 2005). "From the ashes of the Phoenix: Lessons for contemporary counterinsurgency operations" (PDF). Air University. Archived from the original (PDF) on August 24, 2006.
- Turco, Al (June 2, 1999). "Fitzgibbon's name is on the Wall". Stoneham Independent. Archived from the original on December 19, 2006.
- United States, Government (2010). "Statistical information about casualties of the Vietnam War". National Archives and Records Administration.
