= Harry Griffith Cramer Jr. =

US Army officer (1926–1957)

- Born: May 24, 1926; Johnstown, Pennsylvania, U.S.
- Died: October 21, 1957 (aged 31); Nha Trang, South Vietnam
- Burial place: United States Military Academy, West Point, New York
- Education: Westmont-Upper Yoder High School
- Spouse: Anne Supple
- Children: 3
- Relatives: Wilson Cramer
- Military career
- Allegiance: United States
- Branch: United States Army
- Rank: Captain
- Unit: 14th Special Forces Operational Detachment
- Conflicts: Korean War; Vietnam War
- Awards: Silver Star

Captain Harry Griffith Cramer Jr. (May 24, 1926 – October 21, 1957) was an American soldier who served in Korea and Vietnam. He was one of the first U.S. Army soldiers to be killed in the Vietnam War. A street at Fort Lewis, Washington is named in his honor. He is buried at the United States Military Academy, West Point, New York.

== Childhood ==
Cramer came from a military family. His grandfather Wilson Cramer had been a sergeant of Pennsylvania Volunteers in the Civil War, and his father (Harry "Coach" Cramer) had served as a captain in the Army's 808th Pioneer Infantry during World War I. His father was the football coach at Johnstown High School.The family lived in a large brick home at 321 Luzerne Street in the Westmont suburb of Johnstown. The house still stands today.

== West Point ==
Cramer graduated from Upper Yoder- Westmont High School in 1942 at the age of 16. He applied for West Point, but was underage, so he went to the Carson Long Military Institute in New Bloomfield, Pennsylvania for a year. He entered West Point in 1943 at the age of 17, joining the Class of 1946.

He initially was on the Army football squad. He had to drop it to stay focused on academic challenges, despite pressure from the coaches and other cadets. Harry graduated in June 1946 at the age of 20, the youngest of over 800 cadets in his class.

== Post-war ==
After graduation, he went through Infantry Basic Course and Airborne School at Fort Benning. While there, he and classmate Frank "Taffy" Tucker owned a used Taylorcraft light plane. They used to fly cross-country to New Orleans or Savannah on the weekends, barely getting back before Monday classes – earning him the nickname of "Hairsbreadth Harry".

His first service was as a platoon leader with Company B, 1st Battalion of the famous African-American 24th Infantry Regiment, 25th Infantry Division at Camp Majestic, Gifu, during the Occupation of Japan. Camp Majestic was the former Kagamigahara Airfield, a kamikaze base during the Second World War. Harry returned stateside to serve at Fort Dix, New Jersey, as an airborne recruiting officer from June 1950 to February 1951.

== Korean War ==
When the Korean War broke out in 1950, Harry requested a combat assignment. He got a transfer back to his old outfit – the 24th Infantry – as platoon leader and then company commander of Company B in March 1951. On March 28, 1951, during the Han River crossing his company was involved in attacking a strongly held enemy position near Haeryong. The attack stalled due to heavy fire and his unit was pinned behind a ridge. Cramer personally led a bayonet charge that drove the enemy from their trenches, allowing the unit to advance, but was wounded by machine gun fire. For his actions, he was later presented with the Purple Heart and the Silver Star for gallantry in action by the 25th Division's commander, Brig. Gen. Joseph Sladen Bradley, and was promoted to captain. After three months' recuperation in Japan, he returned to the front to serve as the commander of Company D (Heavy Weapons), 1st Battalion, 24th Infantry. He was then wounded again by mortar shell fragments to his shoulder and back, earning the bronze oak leaf cluster to his Purple Heart. He later found out that at the same time his best friend Frank Tucker had died in combat on a nearby hill. In October 1951, the 24th Infantry was finally disbanded under desegregation.

From October 1951 to April 1952, he served with the 2nd Battalion, 14th Infantry Regiment, 25th Division. He realized the war would be a stalemate until a truce or peace treaty was signed, so he transferred to work as an aerial observer in an artillery spotter plane. (Although a capable civilian pilot, he was never trained as a military aviator.) The Artillery Corps believed an experienced infantry officer would have an eye for the terrain and be able to find enemy "hiding spots" an artillery spotter might miss.

In 1952, he was rotated stateside. He was reassigned to the G-2 staff of the Headquarters and Headquarters Company (HHC) of the 82nd Airborne Division. After completing the Infantry Advanced Course at Fort Benning, he attended and passed the Special Forces selection course at Fort Bragg, North Carolina - the first West Point graduate to do so. After graduating, he was assigned to the 77th Special Forces Group. From 1955 to 1956 he was assigned as an Operational Detachment commander.

== Vietnam service ==
Captain Cramer was assigned to the Mobile Training Team, 14th Special Forces Operational Detachment (Area), MAAGV. The sixteen-man 14th SFOD, under the cover of the "8251st Army Service Unit", was transferred to Fort Shafter, Hawaii in June 1956 and shortly thereafter to Korea, the Philippines, Taiwan, Thailand, and Vietnam. The Mobile Training Team's job was to train indigenous Special Forces teams in various military skills. The 14th SFOD was later placed under the newly formed 1st Special Forces Group at Fort Buckner, Okinawa, Japan on June 24, 1957.

The Mobile Training team was initially led by Lt. Col. Albert Scott Madding and MSgt. Robert L. Voss, until they were recalled to Okinawa to become the commander and sergeant major (respectively) of the 1st Special Forces Group. Command of the mission was then assumed by Captain Cramer. His team was composed of MSgt. Francis J. "Fran" Ruddy (Team Sergeant), MSgt. Fred Williamson (Communications Chief), MSgt. Raymond LaBombard (Operations & Intelligence), SFC Chalmers Archer (Senior Medic), SFC Bobby Newman (Weapons), SFC Lester Ruper (Medic), SFC Donald Stetson (Senior Radio Operator), SFC James Hanks (Senior Radio Operator), Msgt Jacques Standing (Radio Operator), and SP2 Earl Kalani (Demolitions). The men under Cramer's command were either highly decorated combat veterans like himself, with service going back to World War II or Korea, or junior NCOs who had demonstrated high levels of motivation and competence.

In September 1956, they set up airborne, jumpmaster and Ranger training for the Royal Thai Ranger Battalion. While there, Cramer earned Royal Thai Army parachute wings.

From June to November 1957, they began training Vietnamese Special Forces in raiding operations and related skills. The realistic exercises involved small-scale ambushes and raids. The ARVN 15th Light Division in the field near Nha Trang was used as the "opposing force".

The class was undergoing a series of field training exercises before their graduation in late October, when Cramer was involved in a training accident on October 21, 1957. During an ambush drill, a Vietnamese soldier near Cramer was readying to throw a lit block of melinite (a French military high explosive) when it prematurely detonated. The melinite was later determined to have deteriorated in storage and was unstable. Cramer died instantly and other members of the team and their students were wounded.

== Vietnam Veterans Memorial ==
Cramer's name was added to "The Wall" in November, 1983. This was after successful efforts by Captain Cramer's son, Lt. Col. Harry G. Cramer III USAR, then an active duty Army officer, to get the Department of Defense to acknowledge his father's death. Capt. Cramer's son asked that his father's name simply be added to the center (1E) stone, out of sequence, but it is still clearly listed in the chronological book at "The Wall" as 1957, not 1959.) In October 2007, The Army conducted an official ceremony at the U.S. Military Academy at West Point, from which Capt. Cramer had graduated, to mark the 50th Anniversary of the first Vietnam casualty.

== "First casualty in Vietnam" ==
Cramer was reckoned the first casualty in Vietnam when his name was added to the Vietnam Memorial in 1983. Previously it had been declared as Spec/4 James T. Davis, who died (along with nine South Vietnamese soldiers) in a Viet Cong ambush on December 22, 1961. Some historians now consider the first casualty to be murdered Air Force Technical Sergeant Richard B. Fitzgibbon Jr. Fitzgibbon was shot after a dispute with a drunken fellow airman and died of his wounds on June 8, 1956.

Cramer is still considered the first US Army casualty in Vietnam, as well as the first casualty of the newly formed 1st Special Forces Group. To honor him, the men of the 1st SFG wore black armbands for 30 days after his death. A parachute drop zone on Okinawa, CRAMER DZ, was named in his honor. Later, when the 1st Special Forces Group moved into its new facilities at Fort Lewis in 1987, they named a street (Cramer Avenue) after him.

== Family ==
Harry married Anne Charmonte Supple of Newburgh, NY at the Catholic Chapel at West Point on June 25, 1947. They had three children (two daughters and one son):

- Kainan Kelly "Kai" Cramer - president of Cramer & Sirras, a legal recruiting firm.
- Anne Quinn Cramer
- Hank Cramer -- Harry Griffith Cramer III (born 1953) – Served in the US Army with the 1st Special Forces Group, US Special Forces, later rising to the rank of lieutenant-colonel.

== Decorations ==
Cramer received the following decorations:

=== American awards ===
- Combat Infantryman's Badge
- Silver Star
- Purple Heart with Bronze Oak Leaf Cluster
- American Campaign Medal (World War II 1943–1945)
- World War II Victory Medal
- Army of Occupation Medal with "Japan" clasp
- National Defense Service Medal (Korean War)
- Korean Service Medal with 4 Bronze Stars (First United Nations Counteroffensive, Chinese Communist Forces Spring Offensive, United Nations Summer-Fall Offensive, Second Korean Winter Offensive)
- Airborne Glider Badge
- Senior Parachutist Badge (US Army)

=== Unit citations ===
- Army Presidential Unit Citation w/. Bronze Oakleaf Cluster - 25th Infantry Division, Korean War
- Korean Presidential Unit Citation - 25th Infantry Division, Korean War

=== Foreign awards and badges ===
- United Nations Service Medal with "Korea" Clasp
- Vietnam Campaign Medal with " '60" Clasp
- Republic of Korea War Service Medal
- Royal Thai Army Parachutist Badge
- Republic Of Vietnam Parachute Badge
