= Outline of the Vietnam War =

Overview of and topical guide to the Vietnam War

The following outline is provided as an overview of and topical guide to the Vietnam War:

Vietnam War, a civil war and a proxy war in the Cold War, occurred in Vietnam, Laos, and Cambodia from 1 November 1955 to the fall of Saigon on 30 April 1975. This war followed the First Indochina War (1946–1954) and was fought between North Vietnam—supported by communist states such as the Soviet Union, China—and the government of South Vietnam—supported by the United States, South Korea, Australia, New Zealand, Thailand and other anti-communist allies. The Viet Cong (also known as the National Liberation Front, or NLF), a South Vietnamese communist common front, aided by the North, fought a guerrilla war against anti-communist forces in the region which was won militarily. The People's Army of Vietnam, also known as the North Vietnamese Army (NVA), engaged in a more conventional war, at times committing large units to battle.

== General history of the Vietnam War ==
- Gulf of Tonkin Incident
- Opposition to United States involvement in the Vietnam War
  - List of congressional opponents of the Vietnam War
- Protests against the Vietnam War
- U.S. news media and the Vietnam War
- Weapons of the Vietnam War
  - Landmines in the Vietnam War
- Forward air control during the Vietnam War
- Aftermath of the Vietnam War
  - Vietnam War POW/MIA issue
    - Australians missing in action in the Vietnam War
    - List of Puerto Ricans missing in action in the Vietnam War
  - Vietnam War casualties
    - List of journalists killed and missing in the Vietnam War

=== Participants in the Vietnam War ===
==== North Vietnam and its allies ====
- North Vietnam
- China in the Vietnam War
- Soviet Union (Vietnam War#Soviet Union)
- North Korea

==== South Vietnam and its allies ====
- South Vietnam
- Australia in the Vietnam War
- New Zealand in the Vietnam War
- South Korea in the Vietnam War
  - Republic of Korea Armed Forces statistics in the Vietnam War
- United States in the Vietnam War
  - Formations of the United States Army during the Vietnam War
- Canada and the Vietnam War

=== Years in the Vietnam War ===
- 1940–1946 in the Vietnam War
- 1947–1950 in the Vietnam War
- 1954 in the Vietnam War
- 1955 in the Vietnam War
- 1956 in the Vietnam War
- 1957 in the Vietnam War
- 1958 in the Vietnam War
- 1959 in the Vietnam War
- 1960 in the Vietnam War
- 1961 in the Vietnam War
- 1962 in the Vietnam War
- 1963 in the Vietnam War
- 1964 in the Vietnam War
- 1965 in the Vietnam War
- 1966 in the Vietnam War
- 1967 in the Vietnam War
- 1968 in the Vietnam War
- 1969 in the Vietnam War
- 1970 in the Vietnam War
- 1971 in the Vietnam War
- 1972 in the Vietnam War
- 1973 in the Vietnam War
- 1974 in the Vietnam War
- 1975 in the Vietnam War

== Military activity during the Vietnam War ==
=== Operations during the Vietnam War ===
Listed by starting date:

- Operation Chopper – January 12, 1962 – U.S–South Vietnamese victory
- Operation Sunrise – March 22-April 30, 1962 – Unsuccessful, increased support for the Viet Cong
- Operation Quyet Thang 202 – April 27-May 27, 1964 – South Vietnamese victory
- Operation 34A – (1964)
- Operation Starlite – August 18–24, 1965 – Both sides claim victory
- Operation Piranha – September 7–10, 1965 – U.S-South Vietnamese victory
- Operation Hump – November 5–8, 1965 – U.S–Australian–New Zealand victory
- Operation Harvest Moon – December 8–20, 1965 – U.S–South Vietnamese victory
- Operation Marauder — January 1–8, 1966 – U.S-Australian–New Zealand victory
- Operation Crimp – January 8–14, 1966 – U.S–Australian–New Zealand failure
- Operation Van Buren — January 15-February 25, 1966 – U.S–South Korean victory
- Operation Masher – January 24-March 6, 1966 – U.S–South Vietnamese–South Korean victory, reportedly 10,000+ civilian casualties
- Operation Mastiff – February 21–25, 1966 – Inconclusive, failure to engage North Vietnamese forces
- Operation Birmingham – April 1966 – Allied victory
- Operation Crazy Horse – May 16, 1966 – U.S–ARVN–South Korean allies claim victory
- Operation Hastings – July 15-August 3, 1966 – U.S–ARVN victory
- Operation Prairie – August 1966 – Inconclusive, PAVN avoid destruction
- Operation Thayer – September 13, 1966 – Allied victory
- Operation Deckhouse Five – January 6, 1967 – U.S. failure
- Operation Cedar Falls – January 8, 1967 – VC/NVA defends the Iron Triangle
- Operation Junction City – February 21, 1967 – Inconclusive, allied strategic failure
- Operation Francis Marion – April 6 – October 11, 1967 – Minor allied Pyrrhic victory, heavy VC/NVA casualties
- Operation Baker – April 17, 1967 – U.S. victory
- Operation Union – April 21 – May 16, 1967 – U.S. victory
- Operations Malheur I and Malheur II – 11 May – July 1, 1967 – U.S. operational victory
- Phoenix Program – 1967–1972 – Counterinsurgency program in SVN, 26,369 suspected VC assassinated, partial failure
- Operation Speedy Express 1968–1969 – VC claims U.S. failure, heavy civilian casualties
- Operation Scotland – See Battle of Khe Sanh – U.S. tactical failure
- Operation Pegasus – August 8, 1968
- Operation Dewey Canyon – January 22, 1969
- Operation Apache Snow – May 10–20, 1969
- Operation Chicago Peak – April 1970
- Operation Texas Star – April – September, 1970 – U.S. failure
- Operation Ivory Coast – November 21, 1970 – U.S. failure
- Operation Jefferson Glenn – 1970–1971
- Operation Lam Son 719 – February 8, 1971 – U.S-South Vietnamese failure
- Ho Chi Minh Campaign January 24 – April 30, 1975
- Operation Frequent Wind – April, 1975

=== Battles of the Vietnam War ===
- Battle of Ap Bac – January 2, 1963
- Battle of Go Cong – September 3, 1963
- Battle of Kien Long – April 11–15, 1964
- Battle of Long Dinh – February 28, 1964
- Battle of An Lão – December 7–9, 1964
- Battle of Binh Gia – December 28, 1964 – January 1, 1965
- Battle of Sông Bé – May 10–15, 1965
- Battle of Đồng Xoài – June 10, 1965
- Battle of Ia Drang – November 14–18, 1965
- Battle of Bong Son – January 28, – February 12, 1966
- Battle of A Shau – March 9–10, 1966
- Battle of Xa Cam My – April 11–12, 1966
- Battle of Minh Thanh Road – July 9, 1966
- Battle of Đức Cơ – August 9, 1966
- Battle of Long Tan – August 18, 1966
- Viet Cong attack on Tan Son Nhut Air Base (1966) – December 4, 1966
- Battle of LZ Bird – December 27, 1966
- Battle of Tra Binh Dong – February 14–15, 1967
- Battle of Ap My An – February 17, 1967
- Battle of Con Thien – February 27, 1967 – February 28, 1969
- Battle of Hills 881 and 861 – April 24 – May 9, 1967
- Battle of Ong Thanh – October 17, 1967
- First Battle of Loc Ninh – October 29 – November, 1967
- Battle of Dak To – November 3–22, 1967
- Battle of Tam Quan – December 6–20, 1967
- Battle of Khe Sanh – January 21 – April 8, 1968
- Tet Offensive – January 30 – February 25, 1968
- Battle of Biên Hòa (1968) – January 24 – March 1, 1968
- First Battle of Saigon – January 31, – February 3, 1968
- Battle of Huế – January 31, – February 25, 1968
- Battle of Kham Duc – May 10–12, 1968
- Battle of Coral–Balmoral – May 12 – June 6, 1968
- Tet 1969 – February 1969
- Battle of Hamburger Hill – May 10–20, 1969
- Battle of Binh Ba – June 6–8, 1969
- Battle of Fire Support Base Ripcord – March 12 – July 23, 1970
- Cambodian Campaign – April 29 – July 22, 1970
- Battle of Snuol – January 5 – May 30, 1971
- Battle of Long Khánh – June 6–7, 1971
- Easter Offensive – March 30 – October 22, 1972
- First Battle of Quảng Trị – March 30 – May 1, 1972
- Battle of Loc Ninh – April 4–7, 1972
- Battle of An Lộc – April 20 – July 20, 1972
- Second Battle of Quảng Trị – June 28 – September 16, 1972
- Battle of Trung Nghia – June 8 – September 16, 1974
- Battle of Ap Da Bien – October 3, 1973
- Battle of Quang Duc – October 30, – December 10, 1973
- Battle of Tri Phap – February 12 – May 4, 1974
- Battle of Svay Rieng – March 27 – May 2, 1974
- Battle of the Iron Triangle - May 16 – November 11, 1974
- Battle of Phú Lộc – August 28 – December 10, 1974
- Battle of Phước Long – December 13, 1974 – January 6, 1975
- Battle of Ban Me Thuot – March 10–12, 1975
- Battle of Xuân Lộc – April 9–20, 1975

=== Air campaigns of the Vietnam War ===
- Operation Farm Gate
- Operation Chopper (1962)
- Operation Ranch Hand (1962–1971)
- Operation Pierce Arrow (1964)
- Operation Barrel Roll (1964–1972)
- Operation Pony Express (1965–1970)
- Operation Flaming Dart (1965)
- Operation Rolling Thunder (1965–1968)
- Operation Steel Tiger (1965–1968)
- Operation Arc Light (1965–1973)
- Operation Tiger Hound (1965–1968)
- Operation Shed Light (1966–1972)
- Operation Carolina Moon (1966)
- Operation Wahiawa (1966)
- Operation Bolo (1967)
- Operation Popeye (1967–1972)
- Operation Niagara (1968)
- Operation Igloo White (1968–1973)
- Operation Giant Lance (1969)
- Operation Commando Hunt (1968–1972)
- Operation Menu (1969–1970)
- Operation Patio (1970)
- Operation Freedom Deal (1970–1973)
- Operation Linebacker (1972)
- Operation Enhance Plus (1972)
- Operation Linebacker II (1972)
- Operation Homecoming (1973)
- Operation Babylift (1975)
- Operation Eagle Pull (1975)
- Operation Frequent Wind (1975)

=== Naval campaigns of the Vietnam War ===
- Gulf of Tonkin incident (1964)
- Vũng Rô Bay incident (1965)
- Battle of the Paracel Islands (1974)
- East Sea Campaign (1975)
- Mayaguez incident (1975)

== Military medals ==
=== South Vietnam ===
- National Order of Vietnam
- Vietnam Military Merit Medal
- Vietnam Distinguished Service Order
- Vietnam Meritorious Service Medal
- Vietnam Special Service Medal
- Vietnam Gallantry Cross
- Vietnam Air Gallantry Cross
- Vietnam Navy Gallantry Cross
- Vietnam Armed Forces Honor Medal
- Vietnam Civil Actions Medal
- Vietnam Staff Service Medal
- Vietnam Technical Service Medal
- Vietnam Wound Medal
- Vietnam Campaign Medal
- Presidential Unit Citation (Vietnam)
- Vietnam Gallantry Cross Unit Citation
- Vietnam Civil Actions Unit Citation

=== North Vietnam ===
- Golden Star Medal
- Ho Chi Minh Order
- Defeat American Aggression Badge
- Vietnam Liberation Order
- Resolution for Victory Order

=== United States ===
- Medal of Honor
- Distinguished Service Cross rare
- Navy Cross uncommon
- Air Force Cross uncommon
- Silver Star uncommon
- Distinguished Flying Cross uncommon
- Air Medal frequent
- Purple Heart frequent
- Bronze Star frequent
- Presidential Unit Citation rare
- Vietnam Service Medal very common
- National Defense Service Medal very common
- Commendation Medal common

== Prominent figures of the Vietnam War ==
=== South Vietnamese ===
- Dương Văn Minh
- Trần Văn Hương
- Ngô Đình Diệm
- Ngô Đình Nhu
- Nguyễn Cao Kỳ
- Nguyễn Khánh
- Nguyễn Văn Thiệu
- Ngô Quang Trưởng
- Lê Minh Đảo

=== American ===
- Creighton W. Abrams
- Spiro Agnew
- Clark Clifford
- Alexander Haig
- Hubert Humphrey
- Lyndon Johnson
- Henry Kissinger
- Melvin Laird
- Robert McNamara
- Richard Nixon
- Dean Rusk
- John Paul Vann
- William Westmoreland

=== South Korean ===
- Park Chung Hee
- Chae Myung-shin

=== North Vietnamese ===
- Ho Chi Minh
- Lê Duẩn
- Trần Văn Trà
- Lê Đức Thọ
- Phạm Văn Đồng
- Võ Nguyên Giáp
- Lê Trọng Tấn

=== Cambodian ===
- Lon Nol
- Pol Pot
- Norodom Sihanouk
- Sirik Matak
- Sosthene Fernandez

=== Soviet Union ===
- Nikita Khrushchev
- Leonid Brezhnev
- Alexei Kosygin
- Andrei Gromyko
- Rodion Malinovsky
- Andrei Grechko
- Nikolai Sutyagin
- Anastas Mikoyan
- Nikolai Podgorny

=== China ===
- Mao Zedong
- Zhou Enlai
- Chen Yi
- Ji Pengfei
- Liu Shaoqi
- Lin Biao

== Media relating to the Vietnam War ==
=== Non-fiction ===
- David H. Hackworth. 1989 About Face
- A.J. Langguth. 2000. Our Vietnam: the War 1954–1975.
- Mann, Robert. 2002. Grand Delusion, A: America's Descent Into Vietnam.
- Windrow, Martin. 2005. The Last Valley: Dien Bien Phu and the French Defeat in Vietnam.
- Bernard Fall. 1967. Hell in a Very Small Place: the Siege of Dien Bien Phu.
- Harvey Pekar. 2003. American Splendor: Unsung Hero
- Prados, John. 2000. The Blood Road: The Ho Chi Minh Trail and the Vietnam War.
- Prados, John. 1999. Valley of Decision: The Siege of Khe Sanh.
- Shultz, Robert H. Jr. 2000. The Secret War Against Hanoi: The Untold Story of Spies, Saboteurs, and Covert Warriors in North Vietnam.
- Plaster, John L. 1998. SOG: The Secret Wars of America's Commandos in Vietnam.
- Murphy, Edward F. 1995. Dak To: America's Sky Soldiers in South Vietnam's Central Highlands.
- Nolan, Keith W. 1996. The Battle for Saigon: Tet 1968.
- Nolan, Keith W. 1996. Sappers in the Wire: The Life and Death of Firebase Mary Ann.
- Nolan, Keith W. 1992. Operation Buffalo: USMC Fight for the DMZ.
- Nolan, Keith W. 2003. Ripcord : Screaming Eagles Under Siege, Vietnam 1970.
- Robert S. McNamara. 1996. In Retrospect: The Tragedy and Lessons of Vietnam.
- Larry Berman. 2002. No Peace, No Honor: Nixon, Kissinger, and Betrayal in Vietnam.
- Bergerud, Eric M. 1994. Red Thunder, Tropic Lightning: The World of a Combat Division in Vietnam.
- Bernard Edelman. 2002. Dear America: Letters Home from Vietnam.
- Darrel D. Whitcomb. 1999. The Rescue of Bat 21.
- Oberdorfer, Don. 1971. Tet: the Story of a Battle and its Historic Aftermath.
- LTG Harold G. Moore and Joseph L. Galloway. 1992. We Were Soldiers Once ... And Young.
- Duiker, William J. 2002. Ho Chi Minh: A Life.
- John Laurence. 2002. The Cat from Hue: A Vietnam War Story.
- Gloria Emerson. 1976. Winners and Losers: Battles, Retreats, Gains, Losses and Ruins from a Long War.
- Philip Caputo. 1977. A Rumor of War.
- Al Santoli. 1981. Everything We Had: an Oral History of the Vietnam War by 33 American Soldiers Who Fought It.
- Robert C. Mason. 1983. Chickenhawk.
- Michael Herr. 1977. Dispatches.
- Joseph T. Ward. 1991. Dear Mom: a Sniper's Vietnam.
- Hemphill, Robert. 1998. Platoon: Bravo Company.
- Noam Chomsky. 1967. The Responsibility of Intellectuals.
- Moore, Robin. 1965 The Green Berets (ISBN 0-312-98492-8)
- Tim O'Brien. 1973. If I Die in a Combat Zone, Box Me Up and Send Me Home.
- Frank W. Snepp III. 1977. Decent Interval: An Insider's Account of Saigon's Indecent End Told by the CIA's Chief Strategy Analyst in Vietnam
- Strunk, John. 2015. "We Walked Across Their Graves" Vietnam 1967-The Que Son Valley
- Hayes, Roger. 2000. On Point

=== Fiction ===
- Robert Olen Butler. 1992. A Good Scent from a Strange Mountain
- Nelson Demille. 2002. Up Country.
- Garth Ennis. 2003. The Punisher: Born
- Daniel Ford. 1967. Incident at Muc Wa (filmed 1976 as Go Tell the Spartans).
- Graham Greene. 1955. The Quiet American (filmed 1958, 2002).
- Larry Heinemann. 1986. Paco's Story.
- Gustav Hasford. 1979. The Short-Timers (filmed 1987 as Full Metal Jacket).
- Duong Thu Hương. 2005. No Man's Land.
- Phillip Jennings. 2005. Nam-a-Rama.
- Denis Johnson. 2007. Tree of Smoke.
- Karl Marlantes. 2010. Matterhorn.
- William Pelfrey. 1984. The Big V.
- Stephen King. 1999. Hearts in Atlantis. (filmed 2001 as "Hearts in Atlantis")
- Walter Dean Myers. 1995. Fallen Angels
- Bao Ninh. 1995. The Sorrow of War.
- Tim O'Brien. 1978. Going After Cacciato.
- Tim O'Brien. 1990. The Things They Carried.
- Edward B. Robinson. 2006. The Godhead
- James H. Webb. 1978. Fields of Fire.
- John M. Del Vecchio. 1982. The 13th Valley.
- Wayne Care. 1989. Vietnam Spook Show.

=== Other ===
- The musical Miss Saigon
- The straight play Letter from the South
- The Peking Opera Letter from the South
- The lianhuanhua Letter from the South

== See also ==
- Insurgency
- Vietnamese boat people
- Re-education camp (Vietnam)
