= 2nd Battalion, 319th Field Artillery Regiment =

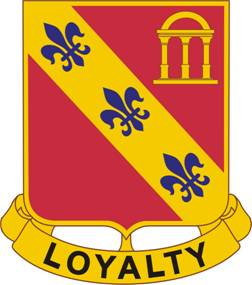
- 319th FAR Distinctive Unit Insignia
- Active: 1917–present
- Country: United States
- Branch: Army
- Type: Airborne field artillery
- Garrison/HQ: Fort Bragg
- Nickname: Black Falcons
- Equipment: M777 howitzer

Insignia
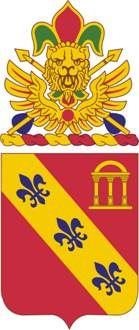
- 319th FAR Coat of Arms

- Beret flash worn by 2-319th FAR and 2-32nd FAR

The 2nd Battalion, 319th Field Artillery Regiment (Airborne) ("2-319 FAR") is the field artillery battalion that is assigned to the 2nd Brigade Combat Team, 82nd Airborne Division. Nicknamed "Black Falcons", 2–319 FAR has participated in battles from World War I to the current day.

== History ==
=== Origins ===
Under the U.S. Army Regimental System, the battalion traces its lineage to Battery B, 319th Field Artillery Regiment, which was originally constituted 5 August 1917 and assigned to the 82nd Division. It was organized and activated 9 September 1917 at Camp Gordon, Georgia and arrived in France in late 1917. The 319th Field Artillery participated in three major campaigns during World War I. At the conclusion of the war, the 82nd Division returned home and was demobilized on 18 May 1919.

The battalion was reorganized and redesignated the 319th Field Artillery Battalion (FAB) in 1942 and was ordered into active federal service on 25 March 1942. On 15 August 1942, the 319th FAB was reorganized and redesignated as the 319th Glider Field Artillery Battalion (GFAB). The 319th GFAB participated in all six World War II campaigns of the 82nd Airborne Division, including assault landings in Normandy and the Netherlands. The 319th GFAB was awarded two Presidential Unit Citations and two French Croix de Guerre with palm.

Under the Pentomic organization from 1957 to 1964, B/319 served as a direct support battery in the 82nd Airborne Division Artillery.

=== Vietnam ===
==== Deployment 1967-68 ====
2-319 deployed to Vietnam with the 101st Division Artillery during Operation Eagle Thrust from 3 December 1967 to 18 December 1967. Battery C, 2-319 fired the Division Artillery's first round on 5 December. The battalion immediately occupied and integrated into base camp fire plans while undergoing a 30-day in-country training program and base camp development. The battalion fired 13,807 rounds in December, and 15,713 in January. On 12 January, 3rd Brigade, with 2–319 in direct support, began Operation Manchester. Battery A conducted an airmobile assault with 1-506 Infantry to FSB Keane and Battery B with 2-506 Infantry to FSB Dave. Operation Manchester continued through 18 February 1968, with a series of movements as the brigade attempted to destroy the Viet Cong (VC) Đồng Nai Regiment. February began with 2-319 batteries at FSBs Meene, Nashua and at Phước Vĩnh. On 9 February 1968, the battalion was issued FADACs and selected personnel received five days of training from the 1st Infantry Division Artillery at Phu Loi 17–23 February.

After the conclusion of Operation Manchester, 3rd Brigade assumed responsibility for the Sông Bé area and Uniontown north. On 4 March, 2-319 destroyed three sampans, one raft and 20 bunkers with one confirmed VC killed. In March, the 101st Airborne Division moved to the I Corps area, leaving 2-319 attached to 3rd Brigade, which was under the operational control of II Field Force, Vietnam, operating in Biên Hòa and Bình Dương Provinces. The brigade conducted Operations Box Springs and Toan Thang under II Field Force from 5 March to 30 April 1968.

On 19 June, Battery A moved to FSB Jackson, followed by Battery C on 20 June. On 25 June, the battalion moved to Dầu Tiếng, and Battery C occupied FSB Kearny on 26 June. On 27 June, Batteries A and C moved to FSB Patton to support operations in the Michelin Rubber Plantation. On 4 July, artillerymen at the Dau Tieng Base Camp repulsed a ground attack. From 11 to 14 July, the battalion occupied FSB Houston to support operations near the Sugar Mill. On 24 July, Battery B replaced Battery C at FSB Patton and Battery C returned to the brigade base camp at Phước Vĩnh. On 30–31 July, the battalion moved from FSB Patton to FSB Jackson, returning to FSB Patton on 2 August. On 27 August, Battery C moved from Phước Vĩnh to relieve Battery A at FSB Davis; Battery A returned to Phước Vĩnh.

On 29 August, Battery C moved to FSB Pershing. From 5–8 September, 3rd Brigade fired 11,500 rounds of artillery during significant contacts- 59 enemy were confirmed killed, described by the 25th Infantry Division Artillery as a "disappointing" result. On 14 September, Battery B moved from FSB Shafter to FSB Pope. On 16–17 September, Battery B defended FSB Pope against enemy ground assaults, killing 104 enemy. The 25th Division Artillery release control of 2–319 on 25 September.

==== September 1968-October 1969 ====
On 18 September, Battery A, 2-319 closed at Camp Eagle, returning to the 101st Division Artillery. Battery A was followed by Battery B on 2 October and the battalion headquarters on 14 October. The battalion completed its return to the 101st when Battery C closed at Camp Eagle on 19 October. Almost immediately, the battalion began conducting operations again. On 21 October, Battery C moved to FSB Bastogne. On 25 October, the battalion headquarters moved to Camp Evans with the 3rd Brigade. On 29 October, Battery A returned to Camp Evans from Panther II.

From November 1968 – April 1969, 2-319 remained based at Camp Evans in direct support of 3rd Brigade. Units of the brigade conducted several named operations, including Operation Rawlins Valley (16–24 December 1968) by 1-506 and 3–187; Operation Todd Forest (31 December 1968 – 13 January 1969) by 1–506; and Operation Ohio Rapids (24 January 1969 – 28 February 1969) bt 3–187, 1-506 and 2–506. The 2-319 began May 1969 with its headquarters at Camp Evans, Battery A at FSB Blaze, Battery B at FSB Berchtesgaden and Battery C at FSB Rakkasan. On 7 May, LTC Fulwyer assumed command from LTC Harrell. On 8 May, a UH-1 hit a Battery C howitzer, resulting in 1 US with minor wounds and minor damage to the howitzer that was repaired. Battery C moved six howitzers by air from FSB Rakkasan to FSB Airborne to support Operation Apache Snow, and received two howitzers from Battery B, moved by air to FSB Airborne from FSB Berchtesgaden. On 9 May, Battery A moved by air from FSB Blaze to FSB Currahee in support of Operation Apache Snow. 10 May, battalion forward headquarters moved by air from Camp Evans to FSB Eagle's Nest to support Operation Apache Snow, which began at 00:01. On 13 May, FSB Airborne was attacked with RPGs, satchel charges and small arms. Batteries A and B fired in support of FSB Airborne, but Battery C sustained 13 killed, 29 wounded and 4 howitzers damaged. From mid-May through mid-June, the battalion consistently fought counterfire fights, receiving wounded from enemy action several times.

Beginning 8 June, 3rd Brigade conducted Operation Montgomery Rendezvous with 2–319 in direct support. On 15 June, Battery A repelled a ground attack on FSB Currahee, killing 54 People's Army of Vietnam (PAVN) soldiers while receiving 5 minor wounded. On 17 June, Battery A received 10 wounded (8 evacuated) from a mortar attack on FSB Currahee. On 7 July, Battery A conducted a raid and fired 130 rounds at special intelligence targets. On 24 July, a forward observer (FO) team from 2–319 with Company C, 1-327 received mortar fire, wounding three members of the FO party, including the RTO who was evacuated. Battery A fired 56 high explosive shells in support. On 25 July, Battery C moved by air from FSB Airborne to Camp Evans to support Operation Kentucky Jumper. One 105mm howitzer sustained minor damage when a CH-47 dropped it during the exfiltration. Operation Montgomery Rendezvous concluded on 14 August.

The 2-319 remained in direct support of 3rd Brigade for Operation Louisiana Lee (15 August – 28 September). On 22 August, Battery C moved by air to FSB Sword to conduct a raid, firing 370 rounds at 33 targets before returning to Camp Evans. On 23 August, the battalion forward headquarters moved from FSB Eagle's Nest to FSB Sword. On 24 August, Battery A defended FSB Berchtesgaden against ground attack, RPGs & mortars. On 26 August, Battery A moved by air from FSB Currahee to FSB Rendezvous. On 28 August, Battery B moved by air from FSB Berchtesgaden to FSB Blaze. 30 AUG, Battery B moved by air from FSB Blaze to FSB Fury. On 4 September, two howitzers from Battery B moved from FSB Fury to Camp Evans; the remaining four howitzers moved from FSB Fury to FSB Rocket on 5 September. On 12 September, Battery B consolidated at Camp Evans. On 14 September, Battery C departed Camp Evans by air for FSB Erskine, then moved by air to FSB Blaze on 20 September before returning to Camp Evans on 25 September. On 27 September, Battery A moved by air from FSB Rendezvous to FSB Blaze. On 29 September, the battalion forward CP departed Camp Evans to vicinity of Mai Loc, joined by Batteries B and C on 30 September; Battery A moved by air from FSB Blaze to Camp Evans.

The 3rd Brigade began Operation Norton Falls on 29 September. On 2 October, 2-319 established a local AWCC (call sign NORTON ARTY) at Mai Loc, Battery B moved by air from Mai Loc to FSB Sandy (renamed FSB Scotch on 3 October), and Battery C moved 2 howitzers by air to Landing Zone 1 to establish FSB Shrapnel; the remaining four howitzers from Battery C were backhauled from Mai Loc to Quảng Trị Combat Base due to lack of security at Mai Loc. One 3 October, Battery C moved one howitzer from Quang Tri Combat Base to FSB Shrapnel; two more howitzers moved on 4 October, with the last joining the battery on 6 October. On 9 October, Battery C moved from FSB Shrapnel to FSB Victory. On 15 October, four howitzers from Battery C moved from FSB Victory to Mai Loc, then on to FSB Catapult for a raid. After firing 700 rounds at 56 targets, these four howitzers returned by air to FSB Victory. On 24 October, the battalion's radar moved from Camp Evans to FSB Scotch. On 25 October, LTC Robert Hammond assumed command of the battalion from LTC Nyles Fulwyler. On 4 November, Norton Falls AWCC closed, and Battery C moved by air from FSB Victory to Mai Loc and then by road to Camp Evans. 7 November, Battery B moved by air from FSB Scotch to Mai Loc, and then on to Camp Evans by road on 8 November. Also on 8 November, Operation Norton Falls was terminated.

==== November 1969 – April 1970 ====
On 13 November, Battery B moved by air from Camp Evans to C-2 to support 2-501st Infantry; Battery B was credited with 7 PAVN killed by artillery on 16 November, before returning to Camp Evans by air on 19 November. On 30 November, Battery C returned to FSB Mai Loc by air. On 1 December, Battery C (with three howitzers from C/2-11) conducted a raid from FSB Mai Loc to FSB Shepherd, firing 289 rounds at (29?) targets, and an additional 179 rounds on 24 targets on 2 December before returning to Camp Evans via air on 3 December, while C/2-11 moved to FSB Arsenal. On 9 December, Battery C moved 2 howitzers by road to FSB Omaha. On 11 December, Battery B moved by air to FSB O’Reilly. On 12 December, 2 howitzers from Battery C returned to Camp Evans. On 20 December, Battery B moved from FSB O’Reilly to FSB Jack by air. On 4 January 1970, Battery A conducted air movement from FSB Rakkasan to Camp Evans. On 5 Jan, Battery C returned from FSB Jeanne to Camp Evans by air. On 16 January, Battery C moved by air from Camp Evans to FSB Shepherd, returning on 17 January. On 24 January, Battery A moved by air to FSB Davis, fired 1275 rounds and returned to Camp Evans. On 27 January, Battery C departed Camp Evans by air to FSB Knight. During February and March, 2-319 conducted 12 more battery level displacements in support of Operation Randolph Glen before the operation ended on 31 March 1970. On 25 April 1970, LTC Walker succeeded LTC Hammond.

==== Operations Jefferson Glen/Monsoon Plan 70, Lamson 719 and Lamson 720 ====
On 5 September, the division terminated Operation Texas Star and initiated Operation Jefferson Glen/Monsoon Plan 70. Under the new plan, 3rd Brigade assumed responsibility for pacification and development efforts for the four districts of Thua Thien Province north of the Perfume River.

On 18 October, LTC K.S. Korpal assumed command of 2-319 from LTC Walker. Throughout the monsoon season from October to December, 2-319 remained relatively static, as 3rd Brigade's infantry battalions conducted search and attack operations in the brigade's area. As the weather improved in January, the 3rd Brigade began to push operations west into the highland jungle areas of the province. On 8 January 1971, Battery C moved from Camp Evans to FSB Rakkasan, replacing Battery A which returned to Camp Evans. On 25 February, 2-319 deployed to Quang Tri Province in support of 3rd Brigade as part of Operation Lam Son 719. Battery A moved from Camp Evans to Mai Loc. On 26 February, Battery B returned from FSB Jack to Camp Evans, deploying to A-2 on 27 February. On 1 March, Battery C moved from FSB Rakkasan to Camp Carroll. On 4 March, Battery B moved from A-2 to FSB Anne. On 16 March, Battery A moved from Mai Loc to map coordinates XD 742441, returning to Mai Loc on 19 March. On 22 March, Battery A moved from Mai Loc to FSB Sarge

On 8 April, Operation Lamson 719 ended and Operation Lamson 720 began as a continuation to Operation Jefferson Glen/Monsoon Plan 70. Between 7 and 10 April, the battalion redeployed from Quang Tri Province, with Battery C moving from Camp Carroll to Camp Evans with 8 April and Battery A from FSB Sarge to Camp Evans on 9 April. On 11 April, Battery A Moved to FSB Gladiator.

==== Redeployment and inactivation ====
Lamson 720 was the last major operation for 2–319 in Vietnam. US troop reductions had started in 1969, but accelerated in 1971. The 2-319 FAR departed Vietnam on 20 December 1971 as part of Increment X of the US Army withdrawal from Vietnam. The 2-319 FAR was inactivated and relieved from assignment to the 101st Airborne Division on 31 July 1972. It would remain inactive until 1986.

=== Operation Iraqi Freedom I ===
In early 2003, 2-319 deployed in support of the 2nd Brigade, 82nd Airborne Division, to Operation Iraqi Freedom (OIF) I. The unit earned a Presidential Unit Citation for extraordinary heroism in action against an armed enemy for its actions while attached to the 3rd Infantry Division from 28 April 2003 to 1 May 2003 and a Valorous Unit Award for sustained offensive operations against determined paramilitary forces, former regime loyalists, terrorists, and religious extremists in Baghdad Province from 7 May 2003 to 15 February 2004.

=== Operation Iraqi Freedom II ===
8 Dec. 2004 through 29 March 2005

=== Operation Iraqi Freedom 2007-08 ===
Beginning in December 2006, 2-319 deployed with 2nd BCT, 82nd Airborne Division as part of the lead BCT of "The Surge" into Iraq. Over the next 15 months, members of the Black Falcons deployed in the Adhamiyah neighborhood in Baghdad, established Combat Outpost (COP) War Eagle, operating as provisional infantrymen as well as training Iraqi forces. 2–319, including HHB, Battery A, Battery B and attached forward support Company G 407th Brigade Support Battalion, were awarded the Valorous Unit Award for actions from 4 January 2007 to 1 April 2008. 2-319 returned to Fort Bragg in March 2008.

=== Operation Unified Response – HAITI ===
14 January 2010 through 18 March 2010

=== Operation NEW DAWN – IRAQ ===
27 May 2011 through 27 November 2011

=== Operation Inherent and Resolve ===
- IRAQ 2017

=== Operation Inherent and Resolve ===
- IRAQ/SYRIA 2020-2021

== Lineage and honors ==
=== Lineage ===
- Constituted 5 August 1917 in the National Army as Battery B, 319th Field Artillery, an element of the 82d Division
- Organized 2 September 1917 at Camp Gordon, Georgia
- Demobilized 18 May 1919 at Camp Dix, New Jersey
- Reconstituted 24 June 1921 in the Organized Reserves as Battery B, 319th Field Artillery, an element of the 82d Division (later redesignated as the 82d Airborne Division)
- Organized in January 1922 at Decatur, Georgia
- Reorganized and redesignated 13 February 1942 as Battery B, 319th Field Artillery Battalion
- Ordered into active military service 25 March 1942 and reorganized at Camp Claiborne, Louisiana
- Reorganized and redesignated 15 August 1942 as Battery B, 319th Glider Field Artillery Battalion
- Reorganized and redesignated 15 December 1947 as Battery B, 319th Field Artillery Battalion

(Organized Reserves redesignated 25 March 1948 as the Organized Reserve Corps)

- Withdrawn 15 November 1948 from the Organized Reserve Corps and allotted to the Regular Army
- Reorganized and redesignated 15 December 1948 as Battery B, 319th Airborne Field Artillery Battalion
- Reorganized and redesignated 1 September 1957 as Battery B, 319th Artillery
- Relieved 1 February 1964 from assignment to the 82d Airborne Division and assigned to the 101st Airborne Division
- Reorganized and redesignated 3 February 1964 as Headquarters, Headquarters and Service Battery, 2d Battalion, 319th Artillery (organic elements constituted 21 January 1964 and activated 3 February 1964)
- Redesignated 1 September 1971 as the 2d Battalion, 319th Field Artillery
- Inactivated 31 July 1972 at Fort Campbell, Kentucky, and relieved from assignment to the 101st Airborne Division
- Assigned 2 October 1986 to the 82d Airborne Division and activated at Fort Bragg, North Carolina
- Redesignated 1 October 2005 as the 2d Battalion, 319th Field Artillery Regiment

=== Campaign participation credit ===
- World War I: St. Mihiel; Meuse-Argonne; Lorraine 1918
- World War II: Sicily; Naples Foggia; Normandy (with arrowhead); Rhineland (with arrowhead); Ardennes Alsace; Central Europe
- Vietnam: Counteroffensive, Phase III; Tet Counteroffensive; Counteroffensive, Phase IV; Counteroffensive, Phase V; Counteroffensive, Phase VI; Tet 69/Counteroffensive; Summer-Fall 1969; Winter-Spring 1970; Sanctuary Counteroffensive; Counteroffensive, Phase VII; Consolidation I
- Southwest Asia: Defense of Saudi Arabia; Liberation and Defense of Kuwait
- War on Terrorism:
  - Iraq: Liberation of Iraq; Transition of Iraq; National Resolution; Iraqi Surge; New Dawn

Note: The published US Army lineage shows no campaigns for the War on Terrorism as of 4 March 2010. Comparison of the battalion's deployment dates and unit awards with War on Terrorism campaigns estimates that the battalion is entitled to credit for participation in the five campaigns listed.

=== Decorations ===
- Presidential Unit Citation (Army), Streamer embroidered CHIUNZI PASS
- Presidential Unit Citation (Army), Streamer embroidered STE. MERE EGLISE
- Presidential Unit Citation (Army), Streamer embroidered DONG AP BIA MOUNTAIN
- Presidential Unit Citation (Army), Streamer embroidered IRAQ 2003
- Valorous Unit Award, Streamer embroidered DEFENSE OF SAIGON
- Valorous Unit Award, Streamer embroidered IRAQ 2007-2008
- Meritorious Unit Commendation (Army), Streamer embroidered VIETNAM 1968
- Meritorious Unit Commendation (Army), Streamer embroidered SOUTHWEST ASIA 1990-1991
- Meritorious Unit Commendation (Army), Streamer embroidered Iraq 2011
- French Croix de Guerre with Palm, World War II, Streamer embroidered STE. MERE EGLISE
- French Croix de Guerre with Palm, World War II, Streamer embroidered COTENTIN
- French Croix de Guerre, World War II, Fourragere
- Military Order of William (Degree of the Knight of the Fourth Class), Streamer embroidered NIJMEGEN 1944
- Netherlands Orange Lanyard
- Belgian Fourragere 1940
  - Cited in the Order of the Day of the Belgian Army for action at St. Vith
  - Cited in the Order of the Day of the Belgian Army for action in the Ardennes
  - Cited in the Order of the Day of the Belgian Army for action in Belgium and Germany
- Republic of Vietnam Cross of Gallantry with Palm, Streamer embroidered VIETNAM 1968-1969
- Republic of Vietnam Cross of Gallantry with Palm, Streamer embroidered VIETNAM 1971
- Republic of Vietnam Civil Action Honor Medal, First Class, Streamer embroidered VIETNAM 1968-1970

Battery B additionally entitled to:
- Valorous Unit Award, Streamer embroidered THUA THIEN PROVINCE
- Valorous Unit Award, Streamer embroidered NINEVEH PROVINCE 2005

Note: Separately cited awards are not listed on the officially published Army lineage, updated 4 March 2010.

== Heraldry ==
=== Distinctive unit insignia ===
319th Field Artillery Regiment Distinctive Unit Insignia

=== Coat of arms ===
319th Field Artillery Regiment Coat of Arms
