= List of conflicts by duration =

The following tables lists armed conflicts by their duration, including both historical and ongoing battles. It includes wars, undeclared wars, and series of wars interrupted by truces but which can reasonably be considered to be a single conflict.

== List ==
War or conflict	Start date	End date	Duration
Reconquista	718	1492	774 years
Anglo-French Wars	1109	1815	706 years
Roman–Persian Wars	54 BC	628	681 years
Byzantine–Bulgarian wars	680	1355	675 years
Roman-Germanic wars	113 BC	476	588 years
Spanish-Portuguese War	1250	1807	557 years
Arab–Byzantine wars	629	1180	551 years
Yaqui Wars	1533	1929	396 years
Yemeni–Ottoman conflicts	1538	1911	373 years
Moroccan–Portuguese conflicts	1415	1769	354 years
Russo-Turkish wars	1568	1918	350 years
Arauco War	1536	1883	347 years
Dano-Swedish wars	1470	1814	344 years
Spanish–Moro conflict	1565	1898	333 years
Apache–Mexico Wars	1600	1915	315 years
American Indian Wars	1609	1924	315 years
Ottoman–Persian Wars	1514	1823	309 years
Burmese-Siamese wars	1547	1855	308 years
Han–Xiongnu War	200 BC	91	290 years
Navajo Wars	1600	1866	266 years
Ottoman–Habsburg wars	1526	1791	265 years
Byzantine–Seljuk wars	1048	1308	260 years
Anglo-Scottish Wars	1296	1547	251 years, 5 months, 2 weeks and 1 day
Chechen–Russian conflict	1785	2017	232 years
Warring States period	453 BC	223 BC	230 years
Muslim conquests of Afghanistan	642	870	228 years
Polish-Russian Wars	1577	1794	217 years, 10 months, 2 weeks and 1 day
Byzantine–Ottoman wars	1265	1479	214 years
Polish–Teutonic War	1308	1521	213 years
Roman conquest of the Iberian Peninsula	218 BC	19 BC	199 years
Russian conquest of Siberia	1580	1778	198 years
Crusades	1096	1291	194 years, 9 months and 3 days
Cossack uprisings	1591	1775	184 years
Byzantine–Lombard wars	568	751	183 years
Russo-Persian Wars	1651	1828	177 years
Spanish conquest of Guatemala	1524	1697	173 years
Spanish conquest of Chiapas	1523	1695	172 years
Genoese–Mongol Wars	1307	1478	171 years
Muscovite–Lithuanian Wars	1368	1537	169 years
Mughal–Sikh wars	1621	1788	167 years
Ottoman–Hungarian wars	1366	1526	160 years
Polish–Swedish wars	1563	1721	158 years
Anglo-Dutch Wars	1652	1810	158 years
Sengoku period	1467	1615	148 years
Australian frontier wars	1788	1934	146 years
Hook and Cod wars	1350	1490	140 years
Mongol invasions and conquests	1206	1337	131 years
Chola-Chalakya Wars	992	1120	128 years
Early Muslim conquests	622	750	128 years
Second Hundred Years' War	1689	1815	126 years
Punic Wars	264 BC	146 BC	118 years
Hundred Years' War	1337	1453	116 years
Russo-Kazan Wars	1437	1552	115 years
Norwegian civil wars	1130	1240	110 years
Tuareg rebellions	1916	Ongoing	110 years
Jin–Song Wars	1125	1234	109 years
Seleucid–Parthian Wars	238 BC	129 BC	109 years
Crisis of the Roman Republic	135 BC	27 BC	108 years
Kurdish separatism in Iran	1918	Ongoing	108 years
Kurdish rebellions in Turkey	6 March 1921	Ongoing	105 years, 8 months and 2 weeks
Georgian–Seljuk wars	1099	1203	104 years
Hephthalite–Sasanian Wars	459	562	103 years
Russo-Circassian War	1763	1864	100 years, 10 months and 4 days
Xhosa Wars	1779	1879	100 years
Zemene Mesafint	1755	1855	100 years
Xinjiang conflict	1931	Ongoing	95 years
Beaver Wars	1609	1701	92 years
Afghan–Sikh Wars	1751	1837	86 years
Iraqi–Kurdish conflict	1918	2003	85 years
Dagohoy rebellion	24 January 1744	31 August 1829	85 years, 7 months and 1 week
Korean conflict	15 August 1945	Ongoing	81 years, 3 months and 5 days
Anglo-Afghan War	1839	1919	80 years
Eighty Years' War	1568	1648	80 years
Spanish conquest of Petén	1618	1697	79 years
Rohingya insurgency	1947	Ongoing	79 years
Muslim conquest of Transoxiana	673	751	78 years
Indo-Pakistani wars and conflicts	22 October 1947	Ongoing	79 years, 4 weeks and 1 day
Kashmir conflict	22 October 1947	Ongoing	79 years, 4 weeks and 1 day
Internal conflict in Myanmar	2 April 1948	Ongoing	78 years, 7 months, 2 weeks and 4 days
Arab–Israeli conflict	15 May 1948	Ongoing	78 years, 6 months and 5 days
Insurgency in Balochistan	July 1948	Ongoing	78 years, 4 months, 2 weeks and 5 days
Ethiopian-Somali wars	23 September 1948	Ongoing	78 years, 1 month and 4 weeks
Anglo-Ashanti wars	1823	1900	77 years
Umayyad conquest of Hispania	711	788	77 years
Karen conflict	31 January 1949	Ongoing	77 years, 9 months, 2 weeks and 6 days
Afghanistan–Pakistan border skirmishes	March 1949	Ongoing	77 years, 8 months, 2 weeks and 5 days
Muslim conquest of Sicily	June 827	August 902	75 years and 2 months
Apache Wars	1849	1924	75 years
French conquest of Algeria	1830	1903	73 years
Dzungar–Qing Wars	1687	1758	71 years
Jewish–Roman wars	66	136	70 years
South Thailand insurgency	1960	Ongoing	66 years
Argentine Civil Wars	1814	1880	66 years
Italian Wars	1494	1559	65 years
Darfur Wars of Succession	1722	1786	64 years
Papua conflict	1 October 1962	Ongoing	64 years, 1 month, 2 weeks and 5 days
Sino-Indian border dispute	20 October 1962	Ongoing	64 years and 1 month
Cross border attacks in Sabah	8 December 1962	Ongoing	63 years, 11 months, 1 week and 5 days
Insurgency in Northeast India	1963	Ongoing	63 years
Muslim conquest of the Maghreb	647	709	62 years
Colombian conflict	27 May 1964	Ongoing	62 years, 5 months, 3 weeks and 3 days
Insurgency in Manipur	24 November 1964	Ongoing	61 years, 11 months, 3 weeks and 6 days
Anglo-Burmese Wars	5 March 1824	29 November 1885	61 years, 8 months, 3 weeks and 3 days
Sixty Years' War	1754	1814	60 years
Dutch–Portuguese War	1601	1661	60 years
Lelantine War	710 BC	650 BC	60 years
Naxalite–Maoist insurgency	18 May 1967	Ongoing	59 years, 6 months and 2 days
Israeli–Lebanese conflict	14 May 1948	18 August 2006	58 years, 3 months and 4 days
Civil conflict in the Philippines	29 March 1969	Ongoing	57 years, 7 months, 3 weeks and 1 day
Western Sahara conflict	17 June 1970	Ongoing	56 years, 5 months and 3 days
Texas–Indian wars	1820	1875	55 years
Basque conflict	31 July 1959	20 October 2011	52 years, 2 months, 2 weeks and 6 days
Bulgarian–Ottoman wars	1344	1396	52 years
Galicia–Volhynia Wars	1340	1392	52 years
War on drugs	17 June 1971	Ongoing	51 years, 5 months and 3 days
Cabinda War	8 November 1975	Ongoing	51 years, 1 week and 5 days
Communist insurgency in Burma	1939	1989	50 years
Byzantine conquest of Bulgaria	968	1018	50 years
Greco-Persian Wars	499 BC	449 BC	50 years
Moro conflict	29 March 1969	22 February 2019	49 years, 10 months, 3 weeks and 3 days
Comanche–Mexico Wars	1821	1870	49 years
Afghanistan conflict	27 April 1978	Ongoing	48 years, 6 months, 3 weeks and 3 days
Assam separatist movements	7 April 1979	Ongoing	47 years, 7 months, 1 week and 6 days
Wars of the Diadochi	322 BC	275 BC	47 years
Caucasian War	1817	1864	47 years
Internal conflict in Peru	17 May 1980	Ongoing	46 years, 6 months and 3 days
Kurdish–Turkish conflict (1978–2025)	27 November 1978	12 May 2025	46 years, 5 months, 2 weeks and 1 day
Maoist insurgency in Turkey	12 September 1980	Ongoing	46 years, 2 months, 1 week and 1 day
Cold War (Indirect War) (outline)	16 April 1946	26 December 1991	45 years, 8 months, 1 week and 3 days
Chadian Civil Wars	1 November 1965	15 January 2010	44 years, 2 months and 2 weeks
Kongo Civil War	29 October 1665	4 October 1709	43 years, 11 months and 5 days
Sino-Dutch conflicts	1620	1662	42 years
Thirty-Eight Years' War	770	811	41 years
Umayyad invasion of Gaul	719	759	40 years
Spanish conquest of the Inca Empire	1532	1572	40 years
Chichimeca War	1550	1590	40 years
Polish–Czechoslovak border conflicts	1918	1958	40 years
Comanche Wars	1836	1875	39 years
Bab al-Tabbaneh–Jabal Mohsen conflict	1976	2015	39 years
Lord's Resistance Army insurgency	January 1987	Ongoing	39 years, 10 months, 2 weeks and 5 days
Sectarianism in Pakistan	1987	Ongoing	39 years
Abkhaz–Georgian conflict	18 March 1989	Ongoing	37 years, 8 months and 2 days
Insurgency in Jammu and Kashmir	13 July 1989	Ongoing	37 years, 4 months and 1 week
Internal conflict in Bangladesh	1989	Ongoing	37 years
Georgian–Ossetian conflict	10 November 1989	Ongoing	37 years, 1 week and 3 days
DHKP/C insurgency in Turkey	1 April 1990	Ongoing	36 years, 7 months, 2 weeks and 5 days
Guatemalan Civil War	13 November 1960	29 December 1996	36 years, 1 month, 2 weeks and 2 days
French Wars of Religion	1562	1598	36 years
Banana Wars	1898	1934	36 years
Anglo-Powhatan Wars	1610	1646	36 years
Nagorno-Karabakh conflict	20 February 1988	1 January 2024	35 years, 10 months, 1 week and 5 days
Somali Civil War	May 1991 (Note: Various start dates have been offered for when the civil war in Somalia began. The Central Bank of Somalia, the United Nations, the US Office of the Secretary of Defense, and Necrometrics all assert that the conflict started in 1991, after the ouster of the Siad Barre administration. Political scientist James Fearon argues that the start of the conflict could be dated to 1981, when armed Isaaq clan militias began to launch small-scale attacks against the Barre regime and its Isaaq members, to the razing of the Isaaq majority town of Hargeisa in 1988 by state forces, or to 1991, following the collapse of the Barre administration and the commencement of interclan warfare. For analytical purposes, he settles on 1991 for the start date of a new civil war, on the grounds that the fighting had begun previously, but that a major party to the conflict was defeated. Robinson writes that the "civil war had effectively begun by 1987", referring to Compagnon.)	Ongoing	35 years, 6 months, 2 weeks and 5 days
Holy Man's Rebellion	1901	1936	35 years
Oromo conflict	1992	Ongoing	34 years
Ayutthaya-Lan Na War	1441	1474	33 years
Anglo-Mysore Wars	1767	1799	32 years
Casamance conflict	1982	2014	32 years
Chiapas conflict	1994	2014	32 years
First War of Scottish Independence	1296	1328	32 years
Insurgency in Laos	3 December 1975	2008	32 years
Libyan resistance movement	1911	1943	32 years
Second Viking invasion of the British Isles	980	1012	32 years
Wars of the Roses	1455	1487	32 years
Aceh War	1873	1904	31 years
Āfāqī Khoja Holy War	1826	1857	31 years
Insurgency in Meghalaya	1996	Ongoing	30 years
Allied Democratic Forces insurgency	1996	Ongoing	30 years
The Troubles	1968	1998	30 years
Thirty Years' War	1618	1648	30 years
Eritrean War of Independence	1 September 1961	29 May 1991	29 years, 8 months, 3 weeks and 2 days
Norman Conquest of Sicily	May 1061	February 1091	29 years and 9 months
Murid War	1830	1859	29 years
Insurgency in Aceh	4 December 1976	15 August 2005	28 years, 8 months, 1 week and 4 days
Intercommunal conflict in Mandatory Palestine	1 March 1920	15 May 1948	28 years, 2 months and 2 weeks
Communal conflicts in Nigeria	1998	Ongoing	28 years
FULRO insurgency	20 September 1964	October 1992	28 years
Nicaraguan Revolution	1962	1990	28 years
Portuguese Restoration War	1640	1668	28 years
Communist insurgency in Sarawak	December 1962	3 November 1990	27 years, 11 months and 2 days
Al-Qaeda insurgency in Yemen	30 December 1998	Ongoing	27 years, 10 months and 3 weeks
Angolan Civil War	1975	2002	27 years
New Zealand Wars	1845	1872	27 years
Peloponnesian War	431 BC	404 BC	27 years
Russo-Finnish wars	27 January 1918	19 September 1944	26 years, 7 months, 3 weeks and 2 days
Sri Lankan Civil War	23 July 1983	18 May 2009	25 years, 9 months, 3 weeks and 4 days
Omani Civil War (1718–1744)	1718	20 November 1744	26 years, 3 months, 3 weeks and 4 days
Mughal–Maratha Wars	September 1681	May 1707	25 years and 8 months
Livonian War	1558	1583	25 years
Spanish American wars of independence	1808	1833	25 years
Insurgency in the Maghreb	11 April 2002	Ongoing	24 years, 7 months, 1 week and 2 days
Insurgency in Ogaden	22 February 1994	12 August 2018	24 years, 5 months and 3 weeks
South African Border War	26 August 1966	21 March 1990	24 years
Indonesian occupation of East Timor	7 December 1975	31 October 1999	23 years, 10 months, 3 weeks and 3 days
Conflict in the Niger Delta	12 March 2003	Ongoing	23 years, 8 months, 1 week and 1 day
Great French War	20 April 1792	20 November 1815	23 years and 7 months
First Punic War	264 BC	241 BC	23 years
Second Afar insurgency	1995	18 July 2018	23 years
Silesian Wars	1740	1763	23 years
Insurgency in Khyber Pakhtunkhwa	16 March 2004	Ongoing	22 years, 8 months and 4 days
Iran–PJAK conflict	1 April 2004	Ongoing	22 years, 7 months, 2 weeks and 5 days
Laotian Civil War	9 November 1953	2 December 1975	22 years, 3 weeks and 2 days
Chinese Civil War	1 August 1927	7 December 1949	22 years
Kivu conflict	2004	Ongoing	22 years
Italian Unification Wars	1848	1870	22 years
Kandyan Wars	1796	1818	22 years
Little War in Hungary	1530	1552	22 years
Norman conquest of England	1066	1088	22 years
Occupation of Araucanía	1861	1883	22 years
Second Sudanese Civil War	1983	2005	22 years
Sistan and Baluchestan insurgency	2004	Ongoing	22 years
Communist insurgency in Malaysia (1968–1989)	17 June 1968	2 December 1989	21 years, 5 months, 2 weeks and 1 day
Insurgency in Paraguay	27 August 2005	Ongoing	21 years, 2 months, 3 weeks and 3 days
United States occupation of Nicaragua	1912	1933	21 years
Lazic War	541	562	21 years
Great Northern War	1700	1721	21 years
Ottoman conquest of Habesh	1557	1578	21 years
Muslim conquest of Persia	633	654	21 years
Eumeralla Wars	1840	1860	20 years
War of the Sicilian Vespers	1282	1302	20 years
Somaliland campaign	1900	1920	20 years
Chittagong Hill Tracts conflict	1977	2 December 1997	20 years
War on terror	12 September 2001	30 August 2021	19 years, 11 months, 2 weeks and 4 days
Mexican drug war	11 December 2006	Ongoing	19 years, 11 months, 1 week and 2 days
War in Afghanistan	7 October 2001	30 August 2021	19 years, 10 months, 3 weeks and 2 days
Byzantine–Sasanian War of 572–591	572	591	19 years
Gothic War	535	554	19 years
Miao Rebellion (1854–1873)	1854	1873	19 years
Basmachi movement	1916	1934	18 years
Communist insurgency in Thailand	1965	1983	18 years
Jeroboam's Revolt	931 BC	913 BC	18 years
Mahdist War	1881	1899	18 years
War in Darfur	26 February 2003	31 August 2020	17 years, 6 months and 5 days
Second Punic War	218 BC	201 BC	17 years
Ethiopian Civil War	12 September 1974	4 June 1991	16 years, 8 months, 3 weeks and 2 days
First Sudanese Civil War	18 August 1955	27 March 1972	16 years, 7 months, 1 week and 2 days
Bolivian War of Independence	1809	1825	16 years
Chilean War of Independence	1810	1826	16 years
Western Sahara War	30 October 1975	6 September 1991	15 years, 10 months and 1 week
Great Turkish War	14 July 1683	26 January 1699	15 years, 6 months, 1 week and 5 days
Lebanese Civil War	13 April 1975	13 October 1990	15 years and 6 months
Rhodesian Bush War	4 July 1964	12 December 1979	15 years, 5 months, 1 week and 1 day
Morean War	1684	1699	15 years
Jewish–Babylonian War	601 BC	586 BC	15 years
Cambodian–Vietnamese War	30 April 1977	23 October 1991	14 years, 5 months, 3 weeks and 2 days
Third Indochina War	1978	1992	14 years
Dhofar Rebellion	1962	1976	14 years
Years of Lead (Italy)	1968	1982	14 years
Taiping Rebellion	1850	1864	14 years
Russo-Turkish War (1686–1700)	1686	1700	14 years
Abyssinian–Adal war	1529	1543	14 years
Marcomannic Wars	166	180	14 years
Second Sino-Japanese War	18 September 1931	9 September 1945	13 years, 11 months, 3 weeks and 1 day
Syrian Civil War	15 March 2011	8 December 2024	13 years, 8 months, 3 weeks and 2 days
Portuguese Colonial War	4 February 1961	25 April 1974	13 years, 2 months and 3 weeks
Darul Islam rebellion	August 1949	September 1962	13 years, 3 weeks and 5 days
War of the Spanish Succession	9 July 1702	11 July 1715	13 years and 2 days
Peruvian War of Independence	1811	1824	13 years
Venezuelan War of Independence	1810	1823	13 years
Wars of Alexander the Great	336 BC	323 BC	13 years
Russo-Ukrainian War	20 February 2014	Ongoing	12 years and 9 months
Napoleonic Wars	18 May 1803	20 November 1815	12 years, 6 months and 2 days
Burundian Civil War	21 October 1993	15 April 2006	12 years, 5 months, 3 weeks and 4 days
Haitian Revolution	21 August 1791	1 January 1804	12 years, 4 months, 1 week and 4 days
Malayan Emergency	16 June 1948	12 July 1960	12 years, 3 weeks and 5 days
Salvadoran Civil War	15 October 1979	16 January 1992	12 years, 3 months and 1 day
Yemeni Civil War	16 September 2014	Ongoing	12 years, 2 months and 4 days
Iraqi no-fly zones conflict	1991	2003	12 years
Wars of the Three Kingdoms	1639	1651	12 years
Cimbrian War	113 BC	101 BC	12 years
Sino-Vietnamese conflicts (1979–1991)	1979	1991	12 years
Guinea-Bissau War of Independence	23 January 1963	10 September 1974	11 years, 7 months, 2 weeks and 4 days
Queen Anne's War	8 March 1702	13 July 1713	11 years, 4 months and 5 days
Mexican War of Independence	16 September 1810	27 September 1821	11 years, 1 week and 4 days
Dano-Swedish War	1501	1512	11 years
Pool Department insurgency	1997	2008	11 years
Insurgency in Punjab	1984	1995	11 years
Sierra Leone Civil War	23 March 1991	18 January 2002	10 years, 9 months, 3 weeks and 5 days
Nepalese Civil War	13 February 1996	21 November 2006	10 years, 9 months, 1 week and 1 day
Houthi insurgency in Yemen	18 June 2004	6 February 2015	10 years, 7 months, 2 weeks and 5 days
Yugoslav Wars	31 March 1991	12 November 2001	10 years, 7 months, 1 week and 5 days
Algerian Civil War	26 December 1991	8 February 2002	10 years, 1 month, 1 week and 6 days
Somaliland War of Independence	6 April 1981	18 May 1991	10 years, 1 month, 1 week and 5 days
Soviet–Afghan War	24 December 1979	15 February 1989	9 years, 1 month, 3 weeks and 1 day
Iraq War	20 March 2003	18 December 2011	8 years, 8 months and 4 weeks
American Revolutionary War	19 April 1775	3 September 1783	8 years, 4 months, 2 weeks and 1 day
Vietnam War (outline)	8 March 1965	29 March 1973	8 years and 3 weeks
Aksumite-Persian wars	570	578	8 years
Iran–Iraq War	22 September 1980	20 August 1988	7 years, 10 months, 4 weeks and 1 day
War of the Austrian Succession	16 December 1740	18 October 1748	7 years, 10 months and 2 days
World War II	1 September 1939	2 September 1945	6 years and 1 day
Jebel Akhdar War	30 January 1954	10 October 1959	5 years, 8 months, 1 week and 3 days
Paraguayan War	1864	1870	5 years, 3 months, 2 weeks and 2 days
Second Congo War (African World War)	2 August 1998	18 June 2003	4 years, 10 months, 2 weeks and 2 days
Russian Civil War	7 November 1917	16 June 1923	4 years, 7 months, 1 week and 2 days
World War I (outline)	28 July 1914	11 November 1918	4 years, 3 months and 2 weeks
American Civil War (outline)	12 April 1861	9 April 1865	3 years, 11 months and 4 weeks
Philippine-American War	4 February 1899	2 July 1902	3 years, 3 months, 4 weeks and 1 day
War of Attrition	1 July 1967	7 August 1970	3 years, 1 month and 6 days
Korean War	25 June 1950	27 July 1953	3 years, 1 month and 2 days
Spanish Civil War	17 July 1936	1 April 1939	2 years, 9 months, 2 weeks and 1 day
War of 1812	18 June 1812	17 February 1815	2 years, 8 months, 4 weeks and 2 days
Nigerian Civil War	6 July 1967	15 January 1970	2 years, 7 months, 1 week and 2 days
Crimean War	16 October 1853	30 March 1856	2 years, 5 months and 2 weeks
Tigray War	3 November 2020	3 November 2022	2 years
War of the Polish Succession	10 October 1733	3 October 1735	1 year, 11 months, 3 weeks and 2 days
Aftermath of the Syrian civil war	8 December 2024	Ongoing	1 year, 11 months, 1 week and 5 days
Mexican–American War	25 April 1846	2 February 1848	1 year, 9 months, 1 week and 1 day
Toyota War	16 December 1986	11 September 1987	8 months, 3 weeks and 5 days
2026 Iran war	28 February 2026	Ongoing	8 months, 3 weeks and 2 days
Gulf War	2 August 1990	28 February 1991	6 months, 3 weeks and 5 days
Franco-Prussian War	19 July 1870	28 January 1871	6 months, 1 week and 2 days
Sand War	25 September 1963	20 February 1964	4 months, 3 weeks and 5 days
Spanish–American War	21 April 1898	13 August 1898	3 months, 3 weeks and 2 days
Ilinden–Preobrazhenie Uprising	2 August 1903	November 1903	2 or 3 months
Falklands War	2 April 1982	14 June 1982	2 months, 1 week and 5 days
Austro-Prussian War	14 June 1866	22 July 1866	1 month, 1 week and 1 day
Turkish-Cypriot War of 1974	20 July 1974	18 August 1974	4 weeks and 1 day
German invasion of Belgium (1940)	10 May 1940	28 May 1940	2 weeks and 4 days
Serbo-Bulgarian War	14 November 1885	28 November 1885	2 weeks
Indo-Pakistani War of 1971	3 December 1971	16 December 1971	1 week and 6 days
Twelve-Day War	13 June 2025	24 June 2025	1 week and 5 days
Russo-Georgian War	1 August 2008	12 August 2008	1 week and 4 days
German invasion of the Netherlands	10 May 1940	17 May 1940	1 week
Six Day War	5 June 1967	10 June 1967	6 days
Rwandan-Ugandan War	5 June 2000	10 June 2000	5 days
Football War	14 July 1969	18 July 1969	4 days
Wagner Group rebellion	23 June 2023	24 June 2023	1 day
German invasion of Luxembourg	10 May 1940	10 May 1940	less than 24 hours
2023 Nagorno-Karabakh clashes	19 September 2023 (13:17)	20 September 2023 (13:00)	23 hours 43 minutes
2008 invasion of Anjouan	25 March 2008 (05:00)	25 March 2008 (12:00)	7 hours
1940 German invasion of Denmark	09 April 1940 (04:15)	09 April 1940	6 hours
2026 United States invasion of Venezuela	03 January 2026 (02:01)	03 January 2026 (04:29)	2 hours 28 minutes
Anglo-Zanzibar war	27 August 1896 (09:00)	27 August 1896 (09:37)	38 minutes

== See also ==
- List of wars extended by diplomatic irregularity
