= Operation Jefferson Glenn =

Part of the Vietnam War (1970–1971)

- Part of the Vietnam War
Date	5 September 1970 – 8 October 1971
Location	Thừa Thiên Province, South Vietnam
Result	U.S. and South Vietnamese victory

Belligerents
United States; South Vietnam	North Vietnam (Provisional Revolutionary Government of the Republic of South Vietnam) Viet Cong

Units involved
(United States) 101st Airborne Division (Airmobile) (South Vietnam) 1st Division	

Casualties and losses
	US body count: 2,026 killed

Operation Jefferson Glenn ran from 5 September 1970 to 8 October 1971 and was the last major operation in which U.S. ground forces participated during the Vietnam War and the final major offensive in which the 101st Airborne Division fought. This was a joint military operation combining forces of the 101st Airborne and the Army of the Republic of Vietnam (ARVN) 1st Infantry Division.

== Background ==
The purpose of this operation was to shield critical installations in Huế and Da Nang by patrolling rocket belts along the edge of the mountains. During the 399 days of operations the Allied troops established multiple firebases throughout Thừa Thiên Province and regularly encountered People's Army of Vietnam (PAVN) and Viet Cong (VC) troops.

== Operation ==
=== 1970 ===
On 7 September Troop B, 2nd Squadron, 17th Cavalry Regiment gunships killed 6 PAVN. On 15 September a bomb damage assessment mission by Troop B found five PAVN trucks destroyed. On 18 September 1970 Troop A, 2/17th inserted the ARVN 1st Division's Hac Bao Reconnaissance Company resulting in one PAVN killed and one AK-47 captured and a further five PAVN observed killed from previous helicopter attacks. On the same day Troop C gunships destroyed a PAVN truck in the A Sầu Valley and follow-up airstrikes destroyed another truck, a .51 calibre machine gun and several bunkers. On 21 September Troop C gunships killed four PAVN. From 24–26 September Troop A gunships killed three PAVN and US airstrikes killed a further five. On 28–29 September Troop C gunships killed two PAVN.

On 5 October the Troop A, 2/17th aero-rifle platoon was landed to recover two PAVN packs, they engaged and killed two PAVN and a mortar position was destroyed by artillery fire killing a further three PAVN. On 24 October Troop A, 2/17th found and destroyed 50 boxes of 122mm rocket warheads.

On 11 December the Troop C, 2/17th aero-rifle platoon was inserted at A Lưới Camp to destroy bridges on Route 548. On 16 December a Troop C LOH was shot down by .51 cal fire. On 19 December a Troop C FLIR team killed 10 PAVN.

=== 1971 ===
On 6 January while searching for a downed Troop C AH-1G, Troop B found an AH-1G lost since 1969 near Firebase Veghel and the crew remains were recovered. From 11–25 January Troop A, 2/17th killed seven PAVN. On 14 January a Troop B LOH was shot down. On 16 January another Troop B LOH was shot down by .51 cal fire. Troop C killed three PAVN near Firebase Currahee.

On 10 February a Troop B LOH was shot down by 0.51 cal fire in the A Sầu Valley with the two-man crew missing. On 11–14 February Troop B gunships destroyed a truck and a bulldozer in the A Sầu Valley. On 18 February the Troop B aero-rifle platoon was inserted to recover the bodies of US Marine helicopter crewmen. Throughout February and into April 2/17th supported Operation Lam Son 719.

On 1 April Troop B's aero-rifle platoon was inserted to recover a downed AH-1G at Firebase Veghel. On 6 April a Troop B UH-1 on a prisoner capture mission was hit by ground fire resulting in one US killed. On 8 April the Troop B aero-rifle platoon was inserted to recover a downed UH-1H. On 10 April the Troop B command and control helicopter was hit by 37mm antiaircraft fire killing the Troop B commander. On 13 April a Troop B LOH was shot down. From 13–15 April Troop A gunships killed six PAVN and destroyed a truck in the "Vietnam Salient" south of Route 9 where Vietnam protrudes into Laos. On 15 April Troop D was inserted into the A Sầu Valley for ground reconnaissance. From 19–23 April Troop A supported the ARVN 54th Regiment and 258th Marine Brigade operating near Firebase Holcomb (16.664°N 106.982°E) resulting in one PAVN tank and one APC destroyed. On 20 April Troop D was again inserted into the A Sầu Valley for ground reconnaissance. On 23 April a Troop B UH-1H flying in support of Vietnamese Rangers was shot down with one US killed. On 24 April Troop D was inserted to reinforce a Ranger team in contact, US losses were five killed, while PAVN losses were 12 killed. On 26 April while inserting the Hac Bao Company Troop A gunships killed seven PAVN. From 27–30 April Troop A destroyed numerous PAVN facilities and killed three PAVN.

On 1 May Troop C's aero-rifle platoon was inserted to extract a downed aircraft from Firebase Airborne but PAVN fire forced their evacuation without recovering the aircraft. On 3 May Troop A destroyed two .51 cal machine guns near Firebase Patton. On 9 May Troop B's aero-rifle platoon was inserted into the A Sầu Valley to destroy a PAVN communications wire network, they were engaged by PAVN resulting in one US killed, Troop D was inserted to support the platoon until the PAVN broke contact. On 10 May the Troop C aero-rifle platoon was inserted on Firebase Zon (16.278°N 107.313°E) to extract a downed UH-1H. From 10–12 May Troop A killed eight PAVN and destroyed a .30 cal machine gun and a mortar while supporting the 369th Marines. On 12 May a Troop B helicopter destroyed a PAVN truck killing the driver. From 14–29 May Troop A patrolled Route 616 killing five PAVN and destroying a truck. On 23 May Troop B gunships killed three PAVN. On 28 May a Troop B LOH on a reconnaissance mission over the A Sầu Valley was hit by a Rocket-propelled grenade and exploded with both crewmen missing.

On 1 June Troop A teams attacked PAVN Base Area 611 in Laos, where they encountered heavy 37mm and 57mm antiaircraft fire, but killed 16 PAVN. On the same day Troop B gunships destroyed a truck and Troop D extracted a downed Troop C helicopter. On 6 June Troop B's aero-rifle platoon successfully extracted a downed AH-1G. On 7 June Troop B gunships killed five PAVN. On 9 June Troop B gunships destroyed two trucks. From 11–28 June Troop A supported Marine units, killing 18 PAVN. On 22 June Troop B gunship s killed seven PAVN near Firebase Fuller. On 23 June Troop B's aero-rifle platoon successfully extracted a downed AH-1G. On 30 June a Troop A unit destroyed a .51 cal machine gun.

On 1 July Troop A helicopters received .51 fire over Route 616, engaged the position killing four PAVN and destroying the machine gun. On 4 July a Troop C LOH received antiaircraft fire and crash-landed north of the A Sầu airstrip, a UH-1H chase ship rescued the crew, but also received fire and made a forced landing at Firebase Blaze and an AH-1G supporting the extraction was hit by ground fire and crashed. From 10–16 July Troop A killed 11 PAVN, while losing an LOH to ground fire. On the same day Troop B's aero-rifle platoon extracted a downed LOH from Firebase Zon. On 3 July Troop B gunships destroyed a truck south of the A Sầu airfield. On 8 July Troop B gunships killed three PAVN and destroyed a .51 cal machine gun. On 15 July Troop A gunships killed 10 PAVN and an AH-1G was hit by .51 cal fire and attempted to autorotate at Firebase Shepard and crashed in a river resulting in one crewman killed and one missing. On 16 July a Troop B LOH was shot down. On 19 July Troop A killed four PAVN while supporting the 258th Marines and later that day attacked a PAVN position killing 14 PAVN and destroying two .30 cal machine guns. From 19 to 29 July Troop B killed 11 PAVN and destroyed a truck in the A Sầu Valley. On 25 July Troop A and tactical air support killed seven PAVN and destroyed two .51 cal machine guns and four bunkers in the Đa Krông Valley. On 30 July Troop A gunships killed eight PAVN and destroyed a .30 cal machine gun.

From 1–9 August Troop A reconnaissance flights encountered heavy antiaircraft fire with one AH-1G shot down while five PAVN were killed. On 6 August Troop B's aero-rifle platoon was inserted to successfully extract a downed CH-47. On 7 August Troop B gunships destroyed a .51 cal machine gun. On 13 August after taking ground fire Troop C directed tactical airstrikes against a PAVN base resulting in 14 secondary explosions. On 16 August a Troop A patrol killed six PAVN and destroyed a .51 cal machine gun. On 19 August a Troop B gunship killed two PAVN. On 20 August a Troop A helicopter was shot down but successfully extracted. On 22 August a Troop A LOH was shot down. From 24 to 30 August Troop A killed 22 PAVN and captured one along Route 608.

On 6 September Troop A killed 13 PAVN and destroyed a .51 cal machine gun. On 8 September Troop C gunships killed one PAVN. On 9 September Troop C gunships killed one PAVN. On 10 September Troop D successfully extracted a downed medevac helicopter. On 11 September Troop A located four PAVN 122mm artillery pieces and these were destroyed with HEAT rockets. On the same day at OP Hickory a Troop B UH-1H detonated a mine resulting in one US killed and Troop C gunships destroyed a truck. Between 11 and 17 September Troop A units destroyed six trucks and an artillery tractor. On 12 September Troop B gunships destroyed an 81mm mortar. On 13 September a Troop C LOH was shot down and destroyed. On 15 September the Hac Bao Company were inserted on Route 608 destroying a large PAVN weapons and supply cache. From 22–29 September in operations over Route 616 and the Đa Krông Valley Troop A destroyed eight trucks and killed one PAVN with one LOH shot down.

On 1 October Troop A gunships killed one PAVN. On 2 October after taking heavy fire Troop A gunships killed four PAVN. On the same day Troop B gunships killed two PAVN. On 4 October Troop C gunships killed one PAVN. The 2/17th Cavalry claimed 1339 PAVN killed and two captured and 96 weapons destroyed and 27 individual and none crew-served weapons captured for US losses of 31 killed.

== Aftermath ==
President Richard Nixon had begun his Vietnamization program in the summer of 1969; the objective was to increase the combat capability of the South Vietnamese forces so that they could assume responsibility for the war against the PAVN/VC as U.S. combat units were withdrawn and sent home. Shortly after the completion of Jefferson Glenn, the 101st Airborne began preparations to depart South Vietnam and subsequently began redeployment to the United States in March 1972.
