= Currahee =

Currahee, a corruption of gurahiyi, a Cherokee word possibly meaning "stand alone," may refer to:

- "Currahee", the motto of the 506th Infantry Regiment, a unit of the 101st Airborne Division
  - Currahee Mountain, a mountain located in Stephens County, Toccoa, Georgia which gave the motto to the 506th Parachute Infantry Regiment
  - "Currahee" (Band of Brothers), the first episode of Band of Brothers written about the 506th Parachute Infantry Regiment
  - Currahee!: A Screaming Eagle at Normandy, a non-fiction book by Donald Burgett, about the actions of the 506th Parachute Infantry Regiment in the Normandy Invasion
- Firebase Currahee, a former U.S. Army firebase
