= Platoon (disambiguation) =

A platoon is a military unit of around 15 to 30 soldiers.

Platoon may also refer to:

- Platoon (automobile), a system for reducing traffic congestion
- Platoon (film) (1986), a Vietnam War film directed by Oliver Stone
  - Platoon (1988 video game), a video game based on the 1986 Oliver Stone film
  - Platoon (2002 video game) (also known as Platoon: The 1st Airborne Cavalry Division in Vietnam), a real time strategy video game based on the 1986 Oliver Stone film
- Platoon system, a technique used in baseball and football
- One-platoon system a technique used in football

== See also ==
- Platoon Leader (film)
- The Anderson Platoon
- Platoon: Bravo Company
- Splatoon
