= Operation Montgomery Rendezvous =

Part of the Vietnam War (1969)

- Part of the Vietnam War
Date	8 June – 15 August 1969
Location	Western Thừa Thiên Province, South Vietnam
Result	US operational success

Belligerents
United States	North Vietnam

Commanders and leaders
John M. Wright	

Units involved
101st Airborne Division	

Casualties and losses
87 killed	US body count: 393 killed 174 individual and 47 crew-served weapons recovered

Operation Montgomery Rendezvous was a security operation during the Vietnam War conducted by the 101st Airborne Division in the area southwest of Huế in western Thừa Thiên Province, from 8 June to 15 August 1969.

== Background ==
Following the conclusion of Operation Apache Snow, the 101st Airborne Division continued operations in the same general area to interdict People’s Army of Vietnam (PAVN) infiltration routes and attack their bases in order to forestall attacks on Huế.

== Operation ==
On the early morning of 14 June, the Brigade command post at Firebase Berchtesgaden was attacked by sappers resulting in 12 US killed and 33 PAVN killed and 3 captured. On 15 June, sappers attacked Firebase Currahee resulting in 54 PAVN killed. The 3rd Battalion, 5th Cavalry Regiment, began armored cavalry operations in the A Sầu Valley on 20 June, but contact continued to be sporadic with the PAVN forces avoiding engagement. On 28 June, the Army of the Republic of Vietnam (ARVN) 4th Battalion, 1st Regiment observed a large force of PAVN moving south in the open near Firebase O'Reilly and called in airstrikes which killed 37 PAVN.

On 11 July, the 1st Battalion, 506th Infantry Regiment assaulted an entrenched PAVN position on Hill 996 (16.2178°N 107.160°E) in the western A Sầu Valley, with 16 killed including the battalion commander Lieutenant Colonel Arnold Hayward; PAVN losses were ten killed. Sergeant Gordon Ray Roberts would be awarded the Medal of Honor for his actions during the battle.

On 18 July, at 15:00, elements of the 3rd Brigade, 101st Airborne Division, air-assaulted into an area 33 miles (53 km) southwest of Huế, received small arms fire. Accompanying helicopter gunships fired on the positions, and the air assault was completed one hour later. One PAVN soldier was killed, and one individual weapon captured.

On 20 July, at 16:30, an element of the 3rd Brigade engaged a PAVN force 30 miles (48 km) of Huế. The fighting continued until 19:30 when the PAVN withdrew, leaving 3 dead. US losses were 2 killed.

On 22 July, 3rd Brigade troops discovered the bodies of 12 PAVN soldiers 32 miles (51 km) west southwest of Huế. They apparently were killed two months previously by small arms fire.

On 24 July, 3rd Brigade troops found the bodies of 13 PAVN 29 miles (47 km) southwest of Huế. They apparently were killed three weeks previously.

On 3 August, at 21:10, an armored cavalry element under the control of the 3rd Brigade in a night defensive position 30 miles (48 km) south of Huế was attacked by PAVN. The troopers defended with unit weapons, including tank guns, and were supported by a USAF AC-47 Spooky gunship. The PAVN withdrew leaving nine dead, four individual and two crew-served weapons.

On 7 August, at 07:30, an element of the 3rd Brigade, operating in a jungle area 11 miles (18 km) northwest of A Shau and 1 mile (1.6 km) east of the Laotian border, received heavy small arms, automatic weapons, and rocket-propelled grenade fire from a PAVN force. The troopers fought back with unit weapons until 08:15, when the PAVN withdrew, leaving two dead and one individual weapon. US casualties were one killed.

On 10 August, at 14:00, an element of the 3rd Brigade engaged a PAVN force 31 miles (50 km) southwest of Huế and 0.5 miles (0.80 km) east of the Laotian border. The PAVN withdrew, leaving 11 dead. While sweeping an area 4 miles (6.4 km) further north and 1 mile (1.6 km) east of the Laotian border at 15:30, another element of the same unit received small arms and automatic weapons fire from a PAVN force. The PAVN withdrew leaving one dead and one individual weapon. U.S. casualties were five killed.

On 12 August, at 06:30, a unit of the 1st Brigade, 5 miles (8.0 km) southwest of Hill 937 (Hamburger Hill) and 1 mile (1.6 km) east of the Laotian border was attacked by PAVN small arms and mortar fire. The infantrymen fought back with unit weapons, and after a 20-minute fire-fight the PAVN withdrew leaving five dead and four individual and one crew-served weapon. A later sweep of the area found six graves of PAVN apparently killed by airstrikes two days previously.

== Aftermath ==
The operation ended on 15 August 1969. PAVN losses were 393 killed and 174 individual and 47 crew-served weapons captured. US losses were 87 killed.
