= Operation Chicago Peak =

Part of the Vietnam War (1970)

- Part of the Vietnam War
Date	24 July – 11 August 1970
Location	A Sầu Valley, South Vietnam

Belligerents
United States; South Vietnam	North Vietnam

Commanders and leaders
(United States) John J. Hennessey; Sidney Bryan Berry (South Vietnam) Ngô Quang Trưởng	

Units involved
(United States) 1st Brigade, 101st Airborne Division (South Vietnam) 3rd Regiment, 1st Infantry Division	

Casualties and losses
(South Vietnam) 3 killed	US body count: 97 killed

Operation Chicago Peak was a joint U.S. Army and Army of the Republic of Vietnam (ARVN) military operation during the Vietnam War designed to keep pressure on the People's Army of Vietnam (PAVN) units in the A Sầu Valley and prevent them from mounting any attacks on the neighboring coastal provinces.

== Background ==
The A Sầu Valley was an important corridor for the PAVN and Viet Cong (VC), who used it to transport supplies from Laos into South Vietnam as well as a staging area for attacks. Previous sweeps of the valley in Operation Delaware (19 April – 17 May 1968), Operation Dewey Canyon (22 January – 18 March 1969), Operation Massachusetts Striker (28 February - 8 May 1969) and Operation Apache Snow (10 May - 7 June 1969) in the preceding years had temporarily disrupted PAVN operations, but were unsuccessful at removing the PAVN/VC from the valley.

The operation was scheduled to commence with the end of the monsoon and U.S. forces launched Operation Texas Star on 1 April to establish firebases to support the operation. However the Battle of Fire Support Base Ripcord and the engagement of PAVN forces on the Khe Sanh plateau in Operation Clinch Valley forced the postponement and scaling back of the operation. One of the objectives of the operation, the Co Pung Mountain area, 4 km northeast of the A Sầu was found to be heavily defended by PAVN with 11 helicopters damaged by anti-aircraft fire and the acting commander of the 101st Airborne Division, Brigadier general Sidney Bryan Berry, was instructed to avoid heavy U.S. casualties.

== Operation ==
The scaled-back operation was finally launched on 25 July with the 2nd Battalion, 502nd Infantry Regiment landed to reopen Firebase Maureen east of Co Pung Mountain. On 30 July with artillery support from Firebase Maureen, the ARVN 3rd Regiment, 1st Infantry Division was landed on Co Pung Mountain. After some initial fighting, the PAVN withdrew from the mountain.

On 6 August the PAVN 6th Regiment attacked the ARVN 1st Regiment's Firebase O'Reilly 8 km north of Ripcord. 1st Division commander General Ngô Quang Trưởng reinforced O'Reilly with another Regiment and the ARVN defended the base for two months before abandoning it in early October.

On 12 August, 101st Airborne commander Major general John J. Hennessey terminated the operation to allow the ARVN to concentrate on defending Firebase O’Reilly. It was speculated that the PAVN attacks around O'Reilly were to divert allied attention from the logistical activity along the border and in Laos or the PAVN were attempting to draw allied forces out of the populated lowlands to provide greater freedom of movement for VC forces in a continuing assault on the pacification and Vietnamization programs.

== Aftermath ==
PAVN losses were 97 killed and ARVN losses were three killed, there were no U.S. killed.
