= Firebase O'Reilly =

Former Army of the Republic of Vietnam firebase

Site information
- Type: Army
- Condition: abandoned

Location
- Coordinates: 16.5057°N 107.172°E

Site history
- Built: 1968
- In use: 1968-70
- Battles/wars: Vietnam War

Garrison information
- Occupants: 1st Division (South Vietnam)

Firebase O'Reilly (also known as Hill 542) is a former Army of the Republic of Vietnam (ARVN) firebase located south of Quảng Trị in Quảng Trị Province, Vietnam.

== History ==
The base is located approximately 26 km south of Quảng Trị and 41 km west of Huế.

On 28 June 1969 during Operation Montgomery Rendezvous the ARVN 4th Battalion, 1st Regiment, 1st Division (1/1st) observed a large People's Army of Vietnam (PAVN) force moving south in the open near the base and called in airstrikes which killed 37 PAVN.

At 17:30 on 27 May 1970 O'Reilly was attacked by the reinforced PAVN 5th Battalion, 812th Regiment. The defending 1/1st, plus one battery of artillery fought for two hours before the PAVN withdrew without penetrating the base. The defenders killed 74 PAVN for the loss of three killed.

=== Siege (9 August to 7 October 1970) ===
On 9 August during Operation Chicago Peak elements of the 1/1st at O'Reilly received two 75mm recoilless rifle rounds killing one and wounding 14. On the same day nearby, other elements of the 1/1st were engaged by a PAVN force and suffered 13 wounded. On 10 August the PAVN fired 40 rounds of 82 mm mortar, wounding four ARVN, but the ARVN killed 18 PAVN. Helicopter gunships from the 2nd Battalion, 17th Cavalry Regiment, supported by airstrikes, engaged several small groups of PAVN the same afternoon killing 13; meanwhile the 4/1st engaged elements from the PAVN 6th Regiment and 324B Division to close the day's engagements. One ARVN was killed and 10 wounded. On 12 August, an element of the 1/1st, in a night defensive position near the base, was attacked by an estimated PAVN company. ARVN casualties were two wounded while the PAVN left 10 dead. Troop B, 2/17 Cavalry and a forward observer on a bomb damage assessment mission counted 33 PAVN bodies, in addition to killing one additional PAVN.

On 16 August 2 km southwest of O'Reilly the 3/3/1st with organic weapons killed 26 PAVN at cost of 10 dead and 12 wounded in two separate engagements. On 18 August a battalion of the 3rd Regiment while in a night defensive position was attacked by an estimated PAVN battalion. The attackers sustained 38 killed while the ARVN had one wounded. On 22 August elements of the 1st Regiment found 20 PAVN bodies which had been killed by airstrikes the previous day. At 05:10 on 23 August the 2/1/1st while in a night defensive position 5 km southwest of O'Reilly received a ground attack. The battalion, supported by a flareship and airstrikes, returned the fire with organic weapons. ARVN losses were one killed and six wounded; 24 PAVN were killed. On the same day elements of the 4/1st engaged a PAVN force killing 10, while one ARVN was wounded. In the same area on 26 August, elements of the 3/1st supported by aerial rocket artillery engaged a PAVN force killing 42 for the loss of three killed and nine wounded. On 31 August the 3/1st, while on a ground reconnaissance near the base, found 20 PAVN bodies killed by air 6 to 12-hours earlier.

On 3 September the 1/1st in a night defensive position received a ground attack, 17 PAVN were killed while the ARVN lost six killed and eight wounded in the engagement. On 8 September elements of the 2/1st, while on a search-and-clear mission near the base, sustained a mortar and ground attack losing two killed and five wounded while killing 13 PAVN. At 06:15 on 10 September a mortar attack against the base using 200 82mm rounds followed by a ground probe, resulted in one ARVN killed and nine wounded while the PAVN lost eight killed. At 02:00 on 11 September the PAVN again struck the base, but the 2/3/1st killed eight PAVN while losing two killed and five wounded. Later that day 2 km southwest of O'Reilly the 2/1/1st engaged elements of the 6th and 29th Regiments entrenched in four or five bunkers. The ARVN were supported by airstrikes, helicopter gunships and artillery. The ARVN unsuccessfully assaulted the bunkers and then withdrew to their night defensive position. The 2/1/1st sustained 21 wounded and eight missing in the attack.

On 12 September following a 150-round mortar attack, I Corps command declared a tactical emergency at O'Reilly. The base was considered subject to an all-out PAVN attack at any moment. The weather, meanwhile, was so poor that the use of airstrikes had to be abandoned. On 13 September O'Reilly was again attacked with 100 rounds of 82 mm followed by a PAVN ground probe. The one-hour mid-morning unsuccessful attack cost the PAVN ten killed while the defenders incurred two killed and five wounded. The next day ARVN elements outside the base sustained 100 rounds of 82 mm mortar fire and 20 CS gas rounds of unknown caliber; ARVN losses were one killed and seven wounded. On 15 September the ARVN 4th Battalion, 1st Regiment was moved by helicopter from Firebase Barbara (16.571°N 107.171°E) to O'Reilly to reinforce the other three battalions of the 1st Regiment. The 4/1st lost one killed and nine wounded the next day in a six-round 60 mm mortar attack on the base. That afternoon the tactical emergency condition of the base was lifted. From 10–15 September 137 airstrikes were flown in support of the base and the adjacent areas. Nineteen B-52 Arc Light missions were delivered south and west of O'Reilly. Artillery support was provided from Firebases Barnett (16.566°N 107.055°E) and Barbara, as well as from O'Reilly itself.

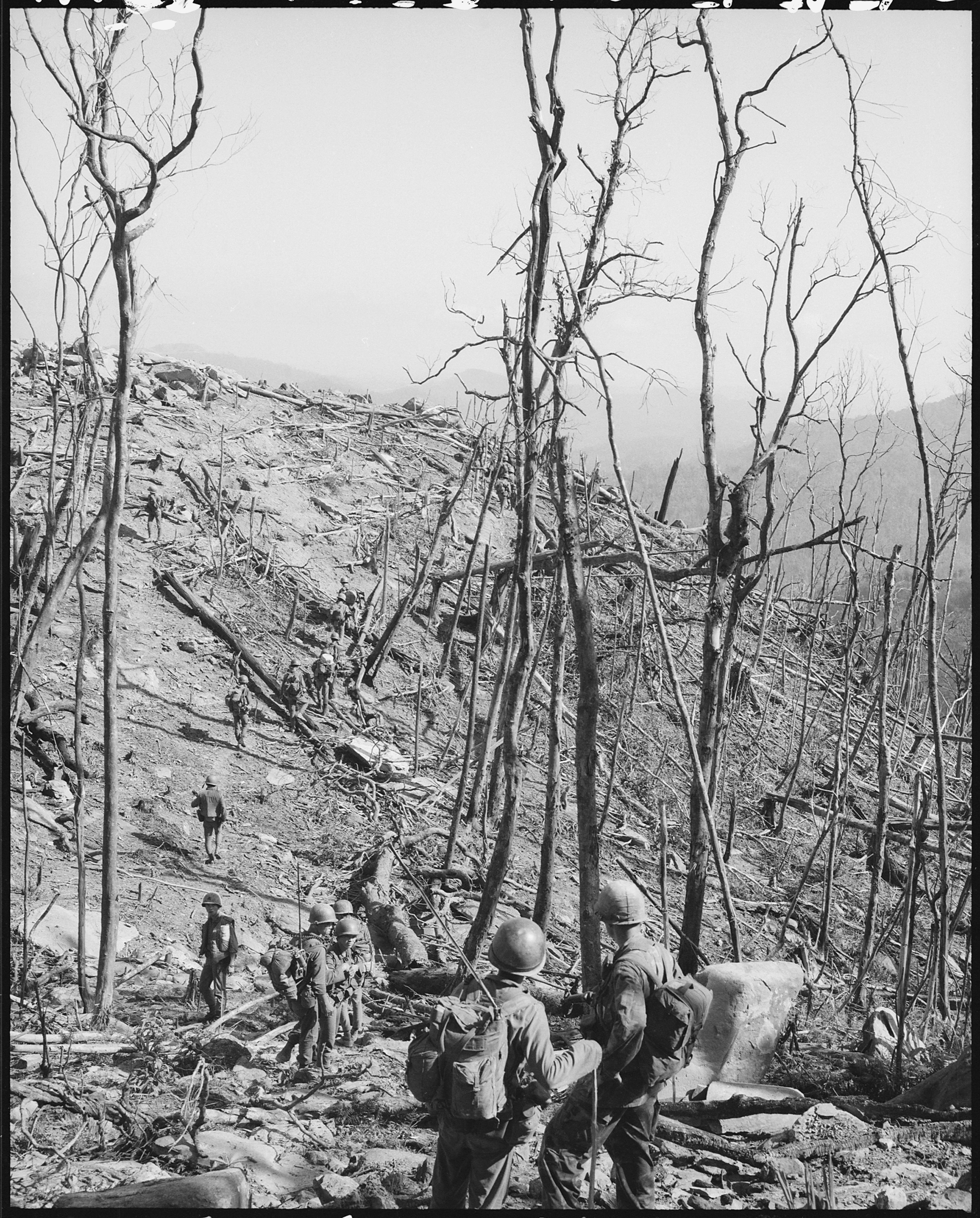
ARVN 1st Division troops patrol near O'Reilly, 8 October 1970

On the morning of 16 September the 2/1/1st, while on a sweep of the area surrounding O'Reilly, engaged a PAVN element. Supported by helicopter gunships of the 101st Airborne Division, the ARVN killed 46 PAVN. In the vicinity of the base on 20 September, ARVN elements contacted the PAVN units in two separate actions. The 1/1/1st killed 15 PAVN from the 29th Regiment in a noontime sweep, at a cost of one ARVN killed and 21 wounded. One hour later, the 4/1/1st battled other elements of the 29th Regiment, no PAVN casualties were ascertained but the ARVN had 12 wounded. Nearby on 22 September, the 29th Regiment attacked the 1/1/1st killing two and wounding at a cost of three PAVN killed. On the early morning of 24 September the 4/1/1st ambushed a PAVN force and killed 26 in the general vicinity of the base.

In mid-September, due to anticipated bad weather which would affect air operations, the ARVN Joint General Staff considered the evacuation of O'Reilly. Firebase Barnett (10 km northwest of O'Reilly) was closed 18 September as part of the preplanned monsoon season relocation of units.

On 2 October O'Reilly was attacked again, the defending 3rd Company, 4/1st, received 50 rounds of 60 mm mortar fire followed by a ground attack from two PAVN platoons. The attack was stopped with a loss of one and two wounded; the PAVN left 12 dead. The base was closed down on the morning of 7 October due to weather and resupply difficulties.

The cumulative totals of casualties in the O'Reilly area from 6 August to 7 October were 570 PAVN killed and 61 ARVN and two U.S. killed. Units of the ARVN 1st Regiment received 115 attacks by fire which consisted of more than 2,700 rounds of mixed 60, 82 and 120 mm mortar fire. It was speculated that the PAVN attacks around O'Reilly were to divert allied attention from the logistical activity along the border and in Laos. Equally, the PAVN might have been attempting to draw allied forces out of the populated lowlands to provide greater freedom of movement for Vietcong forces in a continuing assault on the pacification and Vietnamization programs.

== Current use ==
Satellite images show that the base is abandoned and covered in forestry.
