= Gordon Ray Roberts =

United States Army Medal of Honor recipient

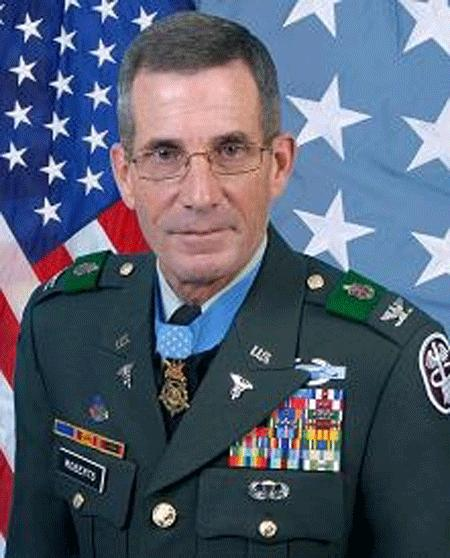
- Born: 14 June 1950 (age 76); Middletown, Ohio, U.S.
- Military career
- Allegiance: United States
- Branch: United States Army
- Service years: 1968–1971; 1991–2012
- Rank: Colonel
- Nickname: "Bird Dog"
- Units: 1st Sustainment Command (Theater), Fort Bragg
- Commands: Brigade Commander Walter Reed Army Medical Center; Officer in charge of force protection, 1st COSCOM, Camp Anaconda
- Conflicts: Vietnam War; Iraq War
- Awards: Medal of Honor; Silver Star (2); Legion of Merit; Bronze Star Medal (2)
- Other work: Social worker

Gordon Ray Roberts (born 14 June 1950) is a retired United States Army officer and a Medal of Honor recipient for his "conspicuous gallantry and intrepidity in action at the risk of his life above and beyond the call of duty" on 11 July 1969 while an infantryman with the 1st Battalion, 506th Infantry, 101st Airborne Division during the Vietnam War.

== Early life ==
Gordon Roberts was born in Middletown, Ohio on 14 June 1950. His hometown is Lebanon, Ohio.

== Vietnam service ==
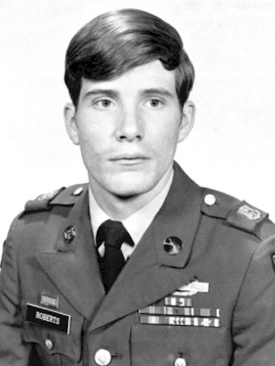
Roberts as an enlisted soldier.

Three days after Roberts graduated from high school, he enlisted in the United States Army in May 1968. He went through training at Fort Benning, Georgia, and then attended infantry school. Roberts was placed in Company B, 1st Battalion, 506th Infantry Regiment, 101st Airborne Division, and deployed to the Republic of Vietnam in April 1969.

By 11 July 1969, Roberts had already distinguished himself, being awarded both the Silver Star and the Bronze Star. On that day, Roberts single-handedly wiped out three machine gun nests, saving the lives of over 20 fellow soldiers on Hill 996 during Operation Montgomery Rendezvous. Roberts spent 14 months in Vietnam until he returned to the United States in June 1970.

On 2 March 1971, he was awarded the Medal of Honor by President Richard M. Nixon for his actions on 11 July 1969. Roberts was the youngest living Medal of Honor recipient and the only one still on active duty until 2010, when Army Staff Sergeant Salvatore Giunta was awarded the medal.

== Post-Vietnam life ==
Following his first enlistment in the army, Roberts attended the University of Dayton and received a bachelor's degree in sociology in 1974. He married and became the father of a son and a daughter. After eighteen years as a social worker, he returned to the Army and received a direct commission as an officer and entered active duty in 1991. His past assignments include eight years of company and field grade command assignments in Korea, Fort Bragg, Haiti, Fort Gordon and Iraq as well as staff assignments at Hunter Army Airfield, Fort Benning, and Kuwait. From June 2008 through June 2010 he served as the Brigade Commander for Walter Reed Army Medical Center. On 1 July 2010, he began duty as command surgeon for the 1st Sustainment Command (Theater) at Fort Bragg, North Carolina. He later assumed duties as the unit's forward Chief of Staff at Camp Arifjan, Kuwait.

Roberts retired from the army on 18 May 2012.

== Awards and decorations ==
In addition to the Medal of Honor, Gordon Roberts's military awards include the Silver Star, the Bronze Star, the Air Medal, the Army Commendation Medal, the National Defense Service Medal, the Vietnam Service Medal, the Republic of Vietnam Campaign Medal, the Combat Infantryman Badge, the Parachutist Badge, and the Presidential Unit Citation.

Medal of Honor
Silver Star with one bronze oak leaf cluster
Legion of Merit
Bronze Star Medal with one bronze oak leaf cluster
Meritorious Service Medal with four bronze oak leaf clusters
Air Medal with Numeral "3"
Army Commendation Medal with four bronze oak leaf clusters
Army Achievement Medal with four bronze oak leaf clusters
Presidential Unit Citation

Badges

- Combat Infantryman Badge
- Parachutist Badge

=== Medal of Honor citation ===

For conspicuous gallantry and intrepidity in action at the risk of his life above and beyond the call of duty. Sgt. Roberts distinguished himself while serving as a rifleman in Company B, during combat operations.

Sgt. Roberts' platoon was maneuvering along a ridge to attack heavily fortified enemy bunker positions which had pinned down an adjoining friendly company. As the platoon approached the enemy positions, it was suddenly pinned down by heavy automatic weapons and grenade fire from camouflaged enemy fortifications atop the overlooking hill. Seeing his platoon immobilized and in danger of failing in its mission, Sgt. Roberts crawled rapidly toward the closest enemy bunker. With complete disregard for his safety, he leaped to his feet and charged the bunker, firing as he ran. Despite the intense enemy fire directed at him, Sgt. Roberts silenced the 2-man bunker.

Without hesitation, Sgt. Roberts continued his 1-man assault on a second bunker. As he neared the second bunker, a burst of enemy fire knocked his rifle from his hands. Sgt. Roberts picked up a rifle dropped by a comrade and continued his assault, silencing the bunker.

He continued his charge against a third bunker and destroyed it with well-thrown hand grenades. Although Sgt. Roberts was now cut off from his platoon, he continued his assault against a fourth enemy emplacement. He fought through a heavy hail of fire to join elements of the adjoining company which had been pinned down by the enemy fire.

Although continually exposed to hostile fire, he assisted in moving wounded personnel from exposed positions on the hilltop to an evacuation area before returning to his unit.

By his gallant and selfless actions, Sgt. Roberts contributed directly to saving the lives of his comrades and served as an inspiration to his fellow soldiers in the defeat of the enemy force. Sgt. Roberts' extraordinary heroism in action at the risk of his life were in keeping with the highest traditions of the military service and reflect great credit upon himself, his unit, and the U.S. Army.

== See also ==
- List of Medal of Honor recipients for the Vietnam War
