= Firebase Berchtesgaden =

United States Army base in Vietnam

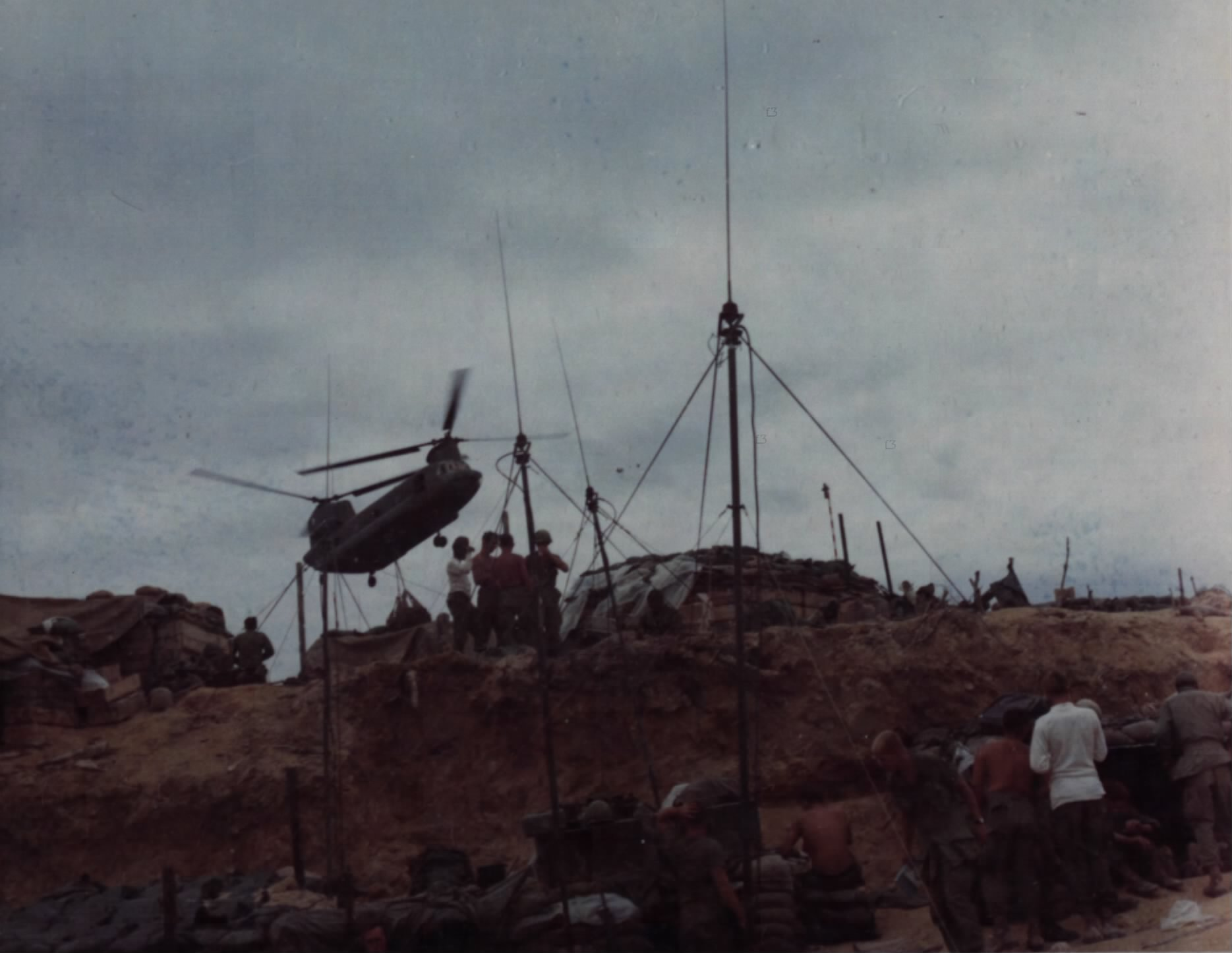
- CH-47A airlifts in a counter-mortar radar unit into Firebase Berchtesgaden, 7 August 1968

Site information
- Type: Army
- Condition: abandoned

Location
- Coordinates: 16.313°N 107.227°E

Site history
- Built: 1968
- In use: 1968-9
- Battles/wars: Vietnam War

Garrison information
- Occupants: 101st Airborne Division

Firebase Berchtesgaden (also known as Firebase Eagle's Nest or Hill 1030) was a U.S. Army firebase located west of Huế overlooking the A Shau Valley in central Vietnam.

== History ==
Berchtesgaden was constructed in 1968 by the 101st Airborne Division approximately 34 km (21 mi) west of Huế and 5 km (3.1 mi) east of Route 547 which ran along the floor of the A Shau Valley. The base was named after the German town of Berchtesgaden, where the Nazi leadership had their alpine retreats and which was captured by the 101st Airborne in May 1945.

The firebase was assaulted by the 6th Regiment, People's Army of Vietnam (PAVN) on the night of 14 June 1969, the assault was repulsed for the reported loss of 12 U.S. killed and 33 PAVN soldiers killed and three captured.

Units based at the firebase included:

- 2nd Battalion, 11th Artillery
- 2nd Battalion, 319th Artillery
- 2nd Battalion, 327th Infantry

== See also ==
Firebase Airborne
