= Republic of Korea Armed Forces statistics in the Vietnam War =

Branch	Number of Deployment	Deaths				Injuries			Missing in Action
Branch	Number of Deployment	Killed in Action	Non Hostile (On Duty)	Non Hostile (Off Duty)	Total	Wounded in Action	Non Hostile	Total	Missing in Action
Republic of Korea Army	288,656	3,476	243	140	3,859	5,667	2,374	8,041	4
Republic of Korea Navy	5,105	2	3	0	5	11	6	17	0
Republic of Korea Marine Corps	31,141	1,123	26	86	1,235	2,702	202	2,904	0
Republic of Korea Air Force	615	0	0	0	0	0	0	0	0
Total	325,517	4,601	272	226	5,099	8,380	2,582	10,962	4

== See also ==
- Vietnam War
