= Firebase Currahee =

Site information
- Type: Army

Location
- Coordinates: 16.225°N 107.239°E

Site history
- Built: 1969
- In use: 1969
- Battles/wars: Vietnam War

Garrison information
- Occupants: 101st Airborne Division

Firebase Currahee (also known as LZ Currahee) is a former U.S. Army firebase in the A Sầu Valley southwest of Huế in central Vietnam.

== History ==
The base was established along the floor of the A Sầu Valley, 43 km southwest of Huế near the intersection of Route 547 and Route 548.

The base was first established by the 101st Airborne Division in May 1969 to support Operation Apache Snow.

From 8 June 1969, the 3rd Brigade, 101st Airborne conducted Operation Montgomery Rendezvous with the 2nd Battalion, 319th Artillery at Currahee providing fire support. On 15 June, a People's Army of Vietnam (PAVN) force attacked the base and was repelled with the loss of 54 PAVN killed and 5 U.S. wounded. On 17 June, PAVN mortars hit the base wounding 10 U.S. soldiers.

== Current use ==
The base has reverted to farmland.
