= Outline of the Cold War =

Overview of and topical guide to the Cold War

Cold War – period of political and military tension that occurred after World War II between powers in the Western Bloc (the United States, its NATO allies and others) and powers in the Eastern Bloc (the Soviet Union and its allies in the Warsaw Pact). Historians have not fully agreed on the dates, but 1947–1991 is common. It was termed as "cold" because there was no large-scale fighting directly between the two sides. Based on the principle of mutually assured destruction, both sides developed nuclear weapons to deter the other side from attacking. So they competed against each other via espionage, propaganda, and by supporting major regional wars, known as proxy wars, in Korea, Vietnam, and Afghanistan.

== Participants ==
Cold War participants – the Cold War primarily consisted of competition between the Eastern Bloc and the Western Bloc. While countries and organizations explicitly aligned to one or the other are listed below, this does not include those involved in specific Cold War events, such as North Korea, South Korea, and Vietnam. It also does not include countries such as China which, while not aligned to either blocs, still played an influential part in the Cold War.

=== Eastern Bloc ===
Eastern Bloc – the communist side of the Cold War conflict, including the Soviet Union and its satellite states in Eastern Europe. Organizations that the Soviet Union created in order to solidify its control over Eastern Europe, and which tied the Eastern Bloc together, included:

- Comecon – the Council for Mutual Economic Assistance was founded in accordance with Joseph Stalin's desire to enforce Soviet domination of the lesser states of Central Europe. Initially, the Comecon served as cover for the Soviet taking of materials and equipment from the rest of the Eastern Bloc. Its members were:
  - Soviet Union
  - People's Republic of Bulgaria
  - Cuba
  - (Czechoslovakia) Czechoslovak Republic (Czechoslovak Socialist Republic since 1960)
  - (Hungary) Hungarian People's Republic
  - Laos
  - (Mongolia) Mongolian People's Republic
  - North Korea
  - (Poland) Polish People's Republic
  - People's Republic of Romania (after 1965, the Socialist Republic of Romania)
  - Vietnam
- Warsaw Pact – defensive pact led by the Soviet Union for defense in Eastern Europe. It was the military complement to Comecon. Its members were:
  - Soviet Union
  - People's Republic of Albania (Note: Withheld support starting in 1961 because of the Sino–Soviet split. On account of the 1948 Soviet-Yugoslav split, which resulted in Yugoslavia becoming the only non-aligned communist state in Europe and Albania geographically cut off from the other Warsaw Pact states. This meant Albania could not be unlike Hungary and Czechoslovakia, enjoyed the liberty to determine her own foreign policy course without. After officially withdrawing from the Warsaw Pact in 1968, Albania joined an informal Maoist oriented alliance led by China, later being joined by Cambodia. The movement never gained traction as a viable alternative to Soviet dominance with Cambodia dropping out in 1977 and Albania following suit the following year.)
  - People's Republic of Bulgaria
  - (Czechoslovakia) Czechoslovak Republic (Czechoslovak Socialist Republic since 1960)
  - (East Germany) German Democratic Republic (withdrew in September 1990, before German reunification)
  - (Hungary) Hungarian People's Republic
  - (Poland) Polish People's Republic (withdrew on January 1, 1990)
  - People's Republic of Romania (after 1965, the Socialist Republic of Romania)

Additionally, the Byelorussian Soviet Socialist Republic (Byelorussia) and the Ukrainian Soviet Socialist Republic (Ukraine) were represented separately in the United Nations in addition to the Soviet Union. Though not parties to the Warsaw Pact, Vietnam, North Korea, Cuba, and Laos, maintained Cold War alliances with the Eastern Bloc.

=== Western Bloc ===
Western Bloc – the United States and countries allied with it against the Soviet Union and the rest of the Eastern Bloc during the Cold War. As part of its containment policy, the United States backed a series of regional alliances:

- NATO (North Atlantic Treaty Organization) – In the North Atlantic and Europe, NATO was formed in 1949, and its members during the Cold War were:
  - Belgium
  - Canada
  - Denmark
  - France
  - Iceland
  - Italy
  - Luxembourg
  - Netherlands
  - Norway
  - Portugal
  - United Kingdom
  - United States
  - Greece - Joined 1952
  - Turkey - Joined 1952
  - West Germany - Joined 1955
  - Spain - Joined 1982
- SEATO (Southeast Asia Treaty Organization) – formed in 1954 for the collective defense of Southeast Asia, though disbanded in 1977. Its members were:
  - Australia
  - France
  - New Zealand
  - Pakistan - including modern Bangladesh
  - Philippines
  - Thailand
  - United Kingdom
  - United States
- ANZUS – formed in 1952 as a form of defensive cooperation in the Pacific. Its members during the Cold War were:
  - Australia
  - New Zealand
  - United States
- METO (Middle East Treaty Organization) – formed in 1955. Although the United States did not formally join, the country did support the alliance, aimed at containing Soviet ambitions in the Middle East. The organization was disbanded in 1979. Its members were:
  - Iran
  - Iraq - Withdrew 1959
  - Pakistan
  - Turkey
  - United Kingdom
- Rio Pact – formed in 1947 for the collective defense of the Americas. Its members during the Cold War were:
  - Argentina
  - The Bahamas - Joined 1982
  - Bolivia
  - Brazil
  - Chile
  - Colombia
  - Costa Rica
  - Cuba - Suspended 1962
  - Dominican Republic
  - Ecuador
  - El Salvador
  - Guatemala
  - Haiti
  - Honduras
  - Mexico
  - Nicaragua
  - Panama
  - Paraguay
  - Peru
  - Trinidad and Tobago
  - United States
  - Uruguay
  - Venezuela

== History ==
- Timeline of events in the Cold War

=== Overview articles ===
- Cold War (1947–1953)
- Cold War (1953–1962)
- Cold War (1962–1979)
- Cold War (1979–1985)
- Cold War (1985–1991)

=== Beginnings ===
Origins of the Cold War – the Cold war was a major part of the aftermath of World War II, and was caused by frictions in the relations between the Soviet Union and the allies (United States, United Kingdom, and France) that emerged during and after the Second World War.

=== Creation of organizations ===
Cold War organizations – throughout the Cold War a series of organizations were created to either further the goals of individual and groups of states, or to act as intermediaries in reducing the tension.

- NATO - Formed 1949
- Southeast Asia Treaty Organization - Formed 1954, disbanded 1977
- Middle East Treaty Organization - Formed 1955, disbanded 1979
- International Atomic Energy Agency - Formed 1957
- Warsaw Pact - Formed 1955, disbanded 1991
- Non-Aligned Movement - Formed 1961

=== Key areas of competition ===
- Nuclear arms race – competition for supremacy in nuclear warfare between the United States, the Soviet Union, and their respective allies during the Cold War.
- Space Race – 20th-century competition between two Cold War rivals, the Soviet Union (USSR) and the United States (US), for supremacy in spaceflight capability. It had its origins in the missile-based nuclear arms race between the two nations that occurred following World War II, enabled by captured German rocket technology and personnel.
- Cold War espionage
- Cold War propaganda
- Proxy wars

=== Conflicts ===
Conflicts related to the Cold War – there were a number of conflicts during the Cold War, and none of them escalated to direct fighting between the superpowers (which would have constituted a hot war). Some of them were:

==== Proxy wars ====
Proxy wars of the Cold War – while the superpowers never engaged each other directly, they fought a series proxy wars throughout the period of Cold War, with one, or both sides arming or otherwise supporting one side against another.

- Korean War (1950–1953) – started when North Korea invaded South Korea. The United States and their allies came to the aid of the South, while China and the Soviet Union came to the aid of the North.
- Vietnam War (1955–1975) – fought primarily between North Vietnam and South Vietnam. The United States and their allies came to the aid of the South, while China, the Soviet Union and others came to the aid of the North. Fighting occurred in Vietnam, along with neighboring Laos and Cambodia.
- South African Border War (1966–1989) – fought between South Africa and its allies on one side, with the Angolan government and its allies, including Cuba, on the other. During the conflict, the United States supplied South Africa and their allies.
- Yom Kippur War (1973) – started when an Arab coalition led by Egypt and Syria launched a surprise attack on Israel. Throughout the conflict the United States and the Soviet Union heavily supplied Israel and the Arab coalition, respectively.
- Soviet–Afghan War (1979–1989) – fought between the Soviet Union and allied Afghan forces on one side, against the insurgent groups known as the Mujahideen. The insurgent groups received aid, and training in Pakistan and China, paid for by the United States and Arab monarchies in the Persian Gulf.

==== Periods of heightened tension ====
US-USSR confrontations during the Cold War – while open conflict did not break out between the two superpowers during the Cold War, there were some very intense confrontations that seemed likely to trigger World War III. As the Cold War stretched on, the main concern became the possibility of a nuclear exchange—the ultimate fear characterizing East-West tensions. Some of these confrontations included:

- Berlin Blockade (1948–1949) – while located wholly within the Soviet zone of Allied-occupied Germany after World War II, Berlin was not considered to be part of the Soviet zone. The major city (and former Nazi capital) was jointly occupied by the Allied powers and subdivided into four sectors. On 24 June 1948 to 12 May 1949, the Soviet Union blocked the Western Allies' railway, road, and canal access to Berlin. Not to be outdone, the Western Allies organized a massive air lift and flew up to 8,893 tons of necessities into the city each day.
- Berlin Crisis of 1961 – the USSR demanded the withdrawal of NATO armed forces from West Berlin. After the West Bloc refused, the East German government put up the Berlin Wall to block traffic between the Western and Eastern sectors of Berlin.
- Cuban Missile Crisis (October 16–28, 1962) – 13-day confrontation between the United States and the Soviet Union concerning Soviet ballistic missile deployment in Cuba. Along with being televised worldwide, it was the closest the Cold War came to escalating into a full-scale nuclear war.
- Able Archer 83 (1983) – NATO exercise mistaken by parts of the KGB, Politburo, and Soviet Armed Forces as cover for an attack. The USSR responded by readying its forces for war.

=== Ending ===
End of the Cold War – While many observers state the 1989 Malta Summit was the end of the Cold War, it was December 1991 before the Presidents of the United States and the Soviet Union formally recognized the conflict's end, with the Soviet Union also being dissolved at that time. Some key events leading up to the end include:

- Removal of Hungary's border fence with Austria (1989) –
- Fall of the Wall (1989) –
- Malta Summit (1989) –
- German reunification (1990) –
- Warsaw Pact dissolved (1991) – Between 1989 and 1991, Communist governments were deposed by popular uprisings in Poland, Hungary, Czechoslovakia, East Germany, Romania and Bulgaria; effectively ending the Warsaw Pact.
- Dissolution of the Soviet Union (1991) –
- Belavezha Accords (1991) – agreement that declared the Soviet Union effectively dissolved and established the Commonwealth of Independent States (CIS) in its place.

=== Aftermath ===
- Effects of the Cold War
  - New world order
- Post–Cold War era

== Cold War foreign policy and diplomacy ==
- Superpower disengagement
- Trust, but verify

== Influential people ==
=== Military personnel ===
- Stanislav Petrov
- Vasily Arkhipov

=== National leaders ===
==== United States ====
- Harry S. Truman – 1945–1953
- Dwight D. Eisenhower – 1953–1961
- John F. Kennedy – 1961–1963
- Lyndon B. Johnson – 1963–1969
- Richard Nixon – 1969–1974
- Gerald Ford – 1974–1977
- Jimmy Carter – 1977–1981
- Ronald Reagan – 1981–1989
- George H. W. Bush – 1989–1993

==== Soviet Union ====
- Joseph Stalin – 1922–1953
- Georgy Malenkov – 1953
- Nikita Khrushchev – 1953–1964
- Leonid Brezhnev – 1964–1982
- Yuri Andropov – 1982–1984
- Konstantin Chernenko – 1984–1985
- Mikhail Gorbachev – 1985–1991

== See also ==
- Cold War II, for tensions that arise between Eastern and Western powers after the Cold War
- Canada in the Cold War
- Cold War in Asia
- Cold War (TV series)
- Culture during the Cold War
- Danube River Conference of 1948
- Finlandization
- List of Soviet Union–United States summits
- McCarthyism
- Mutually assured destruction
- Post–World War II economic expansion
- Soviet Empire
- Soviet espionage in the United States
- Timeline of events in the Cold War
- World War III
