= Firebase Airborne =

Site information
- Type: Army
- Condition: abandoned

Location
- Coordinates: 16.347°N 107.225°E

Site history
- Built: 1969
- In use: 1969
- Battles/wars: Vietnam War

Garrison information
- Occupants: 101st Airborne Division

Firebase Airborne was a U.S. Army firebase located west of Huế overlooking the A Shau Valley in central Vietnam.

== History ==
Airborne was constructed on 8 May 1969 by the 101st Airborne Division approximately 42 km west of Huế and 5 km east of Route 547 which ran along the floor of the A Shau Valley as part of Operation Apache Snow.

The base was occupied by elements of the 2nd Battalion, 501st Infantry Regiment, 2nd Battalion, 11th Artillery and 2nd Battalion, 319th Artillery when it was attacked by the People's Army of Vietnam (PAVN) 6th Regiment and K-12 Sapper Battalion at 3:30am on 13 May 1969, resulting in 22 U.S. and a reported 40 PAVN killed.

== See also ==
- Firebase Berchtesgaden
