= Operation Chopper (Vietnam War) =

Part of the Vietnam War (1962)

- Part of the Vietnam War
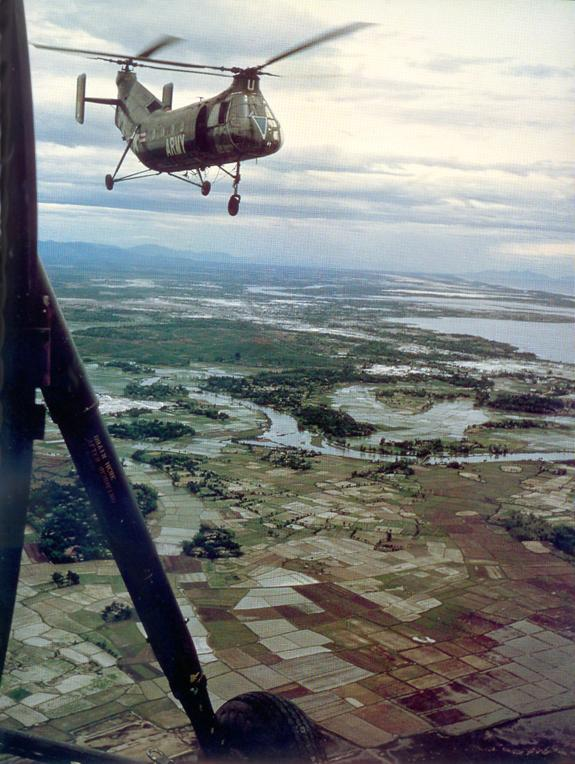
- an H-21 flying over South Vietnam
Date	December 23, 1961
Location	South Vietnam
Result	U.S. and South Vietnamese victory

Belligerents
South Vietnam; United States	Viet Cong

Commanders and leaders
Nguyễn Xuân Vinh	

Strength
360	

Casualties and losses
None	2 killed

Operation Chopper occurred on 23 December 1961 and was the first time U.S. forces participated in major combat in the Vietnam War.

== Background ==
On December 11 1961, the USS Core (T-AKV-41) docked in Saigon with 32 U.S. Army Piasecki H-21 helicopters and 400 crewmen of the 8th Transportation Company (Light Helicopter) and the 57th Transportation Company (Light Helicopter). A little more than 12 days later, Operation Chopper commenced.

== Operation ==
On December 23, the helicopters transported 360 Army of the Republic of Vietnam (ARVN) paratroopers for an assault on a Viet Cong (VC) stronghold and radio transmitter location 10 miles (16 km) west of Saigon. The operation resulted in two VC killed, one wounded, and 46 suspects captured. The VC radio transmitter went off the air and was not located. Additional ARVN troops were flown in on 27 December.

== Aftermath ==
This operation heralded a new era of air mobility for the U.S. Army, which had been slowly growing as a concept since the Army formed twelve helicopter battalions in 1952 as a result of the Korean War. Their observations of French and British airmobile operations in Algeria and Malaysia also fueled this development.

On January 25, 1962, the USS Card (T-AKV-40) with the 93rd Transportation Company (Light Helicopter) aboard, arrived off the South Vietnamese coast near Da Nang and its H-21s were then flown ashore to Danang Air Base.

On April 15, 1962, the United States Marine Corps began Operation Shufly, the rotating deployment of Marine helicopter squadrons, associated maintenance units and air traffic control detachments to South Vietnam to improve the mobility of ARVN forces.
