= Firebase Veghel =

Site information
- Type: Army
- Condition: abandoned

Location
- Coordinates: 16.292°N 107.37°E

Site history
- Built: 1968
- In use: 1968-73
- Battles/wars: Vietnam War

Garrison information
- Occupants: 101st Airborne Division

Firebase Veghel is a former U.S. Army and Army of the Republic of Vietnam (ARVN) firebase located southwest of Huế in central Vietnam.

== History ==
On 16 April 1968, the 1st Battalion, 327th Infantry began an assault on two hills approximately 27km southwest of Huế on Route 547 in preparation for Operation Delaware. The hills were finally captured on 19 April and the firebase was constructed there. The base was named after the Dutch town of Veghel, one of the drop zones during the World War II operation Market Garden, which was captured by the 501st Infantry Regiment of the 101st Airborne Division in September 1944.

Units based at Veghel included:

- 83rd Artillery
- 2nd Battalion, 501st Infantry
- 1st Battalion, 502nd Infantry

Veghel was abandoned and reopened at various times between 1968 and 1971. It was reopened in March 1969 to support Operation Massachusetts Striker and again in February 1971 to support Operation Dewey Canyon II.

Veghel was subsequently used by the ARVN and was captured by the People's Army of Vietnam during the Easter Offensive, but recaptured by the ARVN 1st Infantry Division in October 1972.
