= Operation Massachusetts Striker =

Part of the Vietnam War (1969)

- Part of the Vietnam War
Date	28 February – 8 May 1969
Location	A Sầu Valley, Thừa Thiên-Huế Province, South Vietnam

Belligerents
United States; South Vietnam	North Vietnam

Commanders and leaders
Melvin Zais; John A. Hoefling	

Units involved
(United States) 2nd Brigade, 101st Airborne Division (South Vietnam) 1st Infantry Division: 3rd Regiment; Hac Bao Reconnaissance Company	9th Regiment

Casualties and losses
(United States) 59 killed	US body count: 223 killed 2 captured 30 vehicles captured 857 individual and 40 crew-served weapons recovered

Operation Massachusetts Striker was a joint U.S. Army and Army of the Republic of Vietnam (ARVN) military operation during the Vietnam War designed to keep pressure on the People's Army of Vietnam (PAVN) units in the southern A Sầu Valley and prevent them from mounting any attacks on the neighboring coastal provinces.

== Background ==
The A Sầu Valley was an important corridor for the PAVN and Viet Cong (VC), who frequently used it to transport supplies from Laos into South Vietnam as well as employed it as staging area for attacks. Previous sweeps of the valley in Operation Delaware (19 April – 17 May 1968) and Operation Dewey Canyon (22 January – 18 March 1969) in the preceding year had resulted in over 2,000 enemy casualties, but were unsuccessful at removing the PAVN from the valley.

In early 1969 U.S. intelligence determined that the PAVN Group 559 was transporting supplies east from the southern A Sầu Valley to the base areas of the PAVN 4th and 5th Regiments. These supply lines were protected by the PAVN 815th Battalion, 9th Regiment. The 2nd Brigade, 101st Airborne Division was tasked with conducting airmobile operations into the southern A Sầu Valley to seek and destroy PAVN forces, supply caches and lines of communication and to continue operations southeast along Route 614 in Quảng Ngãi Province.

In Phase I the 2nd Brigade together with the Army of the Republic of Vietnam (ARVN) 3rd Regiment, 1st Division would conduct combined airmobile operations in the southern A Sầu to interdict Highway 548 at the Laotian border, blocking any retreating PAVN forces. The units would then conduct a systematic search to locate and destroy supply caches and disrupt PAVN lines of communication. The operation would receive artillery support from fire bases established in advance. In Phase II the operation would be expanded to cut Route 614 and disrupt PAVN forces operating in the vicinity of Danang.

== Operation ==
On 1 March 1969 engineers were landed to establish Firebase Whip (16.159°N 107.418°E) which was to be the 2nd Brigade's forward command post for the operation. Scarcely had this first outpost been completed when clouds descended upon the A Sầu, blinding United States Air Force (USAF) forward air controllers, forcing the attackers to rely upon radar controlled air strikes and unobserved artillery fire and delaying subsequent moves for about ten days.

On 12 March the 1st Battalion, 502nd Infantry Regiment air assaulted into the abandoned Firebase Veghel and were met with fire from PAVN positions. Additional forces were landed and they established control of Veghel and began patrolling the surrounding area. Two companies from 1/502nd moved southwest of Veghel to a hill where a USAF C–130s had dropped a 10,000-pound bomb to blast a helicopter landing zones on the forested hilltop. They were engaged by PAVN forces in bunkers and battled with them for several days before forcing them to withdraw.

With the 1/502nd engaged around Veghel, on 15 March the ARVN 2nd and 3rd Battalions, 3rd Regiment were air assaulted into the A Sầu, the 2nd Battalion was landed north of Whip and conducted search operations to the northeast, while the 3rd Battalion moved south then west into the A Sầu near where 1/502nd was operating. Neither unit encountered any significant PAVN forces.

On 20 March the 2nd Battalion, 501st Infantry Regiment air assaulted into the southeastern A Sầu and on 22 March the 2nd Battalion, 327th Infantry Regiment air assaulted into the southern A Sầu. No significant forces or supply caches were uncovered by either unit.

On 10 April the 1st Battalion, 501st Infantry Regiment established Firebase Thor (16.12°N 107.488°E) to support that battalion as it moved southeast initiating the 2nd Brigade's operations along Route 614. They also established Firebase Pike (16.04°N 107.486°E) and moved their command post there.

On 16 April the 1/502nd was extracted from Veghel and the next day was landed at Firebase Lash (15.969°N 107.493°E) to conduct search operations.

The units encountered only small units of PAVN trail watchers and snipers but began to discover various supply caches. On 18 April Company D, 2/501st discovered an ammunition cache containing over 23,000 AK-47 rounds and the following day they discovered a further cache containing 103,000 AK-47 rounds and 35 individual weapons. On 20 April Company C, 1/502nd located a cache containing 10 vehicles, 638 weapons and 80 cases of medical supplies, Company B, 1/502nd found a further 4 vehicles. On 29 April 1/501st conducted 4 combat assaults with no results.

On 1 May the 1/502nd reacting to captured documents discovered a hospital complex and a heavy machine repair shop near the Laotian border which yielded over 100 pounds of medical supplies, eight vehicles and 10 weapons. On 6 May 1/502nd air-assaulted into an area 5 km from the Laotian Border again in response to intelligence reports and discovered a recently used medical aid station that contained 18 weapons and 40 cases of medical supplies.

On 6 May 2/501st moved to Landing Zone Sally and stood down from the operation.

== Aftermath ==
The operation concluded on 8 May. The results of the operation were 218 PAVN killed and 2 captured and 857 individual and 40 crew-served weapons and 30 vehicles captured, U.S. losses were 59 killed.

During the operation the USAF forward air controllers spent more than 500 hours aloft, two-thirds of that time actually handling strike aircraft. Attacks by some 500 fighters hit the southern reaches of the valley with three million pounds of munitions—incendiary weapons, high-explosive bombs and 20-mm shells.
