= Platoon: Bravo Company =

Nonfiction book about the Vietnam War

Platoon: Bravo Company (1999) is a Vietnam War memoir by Robert Hemphill (with foreword by Joe Galloway), who commanded B (Bravo) Company, 3rd Battalion, 22nd Infantry of the 25th Infantry Division (U.S. Army) in Vietnam from 1 October 1967 to 18 February 1968. It was first published by Sergeant Kirkland's Press in 1999 and was republished by RoseDog Books in 2006.

The book details Hemphill's experience as Captain of Bravo during the final months of 1967 and into the Tet Offensive of early 1968. The novel can be noted for its mostly positive outlook on the Vietnam War, in contrast to the bleak reputation and media portrayal of the conflict. The book has been both praised and criticized for its presentation from an officer's point of view, although in the book Captain Hemphill states that he is simply writing of the war as he remembers it. Platoon: Bravo Company, is also less popular than other books about the war, such as We Were Soldiers Once...And Young or Marine Sniper: 93 Confirmed Kills.

Hemphill explains the boredom of daily routine as an infantry soldier, leading his company through thick jungle and finding no signs of the enemy (Viet Cong), as well as moments, (and, in some cases, hours) of intense combat, especially during the New Year's Tet offensive. Hemphill also talks about rescuing other units who have fallen into enemy ambushes because of incompetent commanders, and occasionally irresponsible soldiers, as well as having his own company rescued, despite his assurances that his men are "the best in Vietnam."
