= Operation Apache Snow =

Part of the Vietnam War (1969)

- Part of the Vietnam War
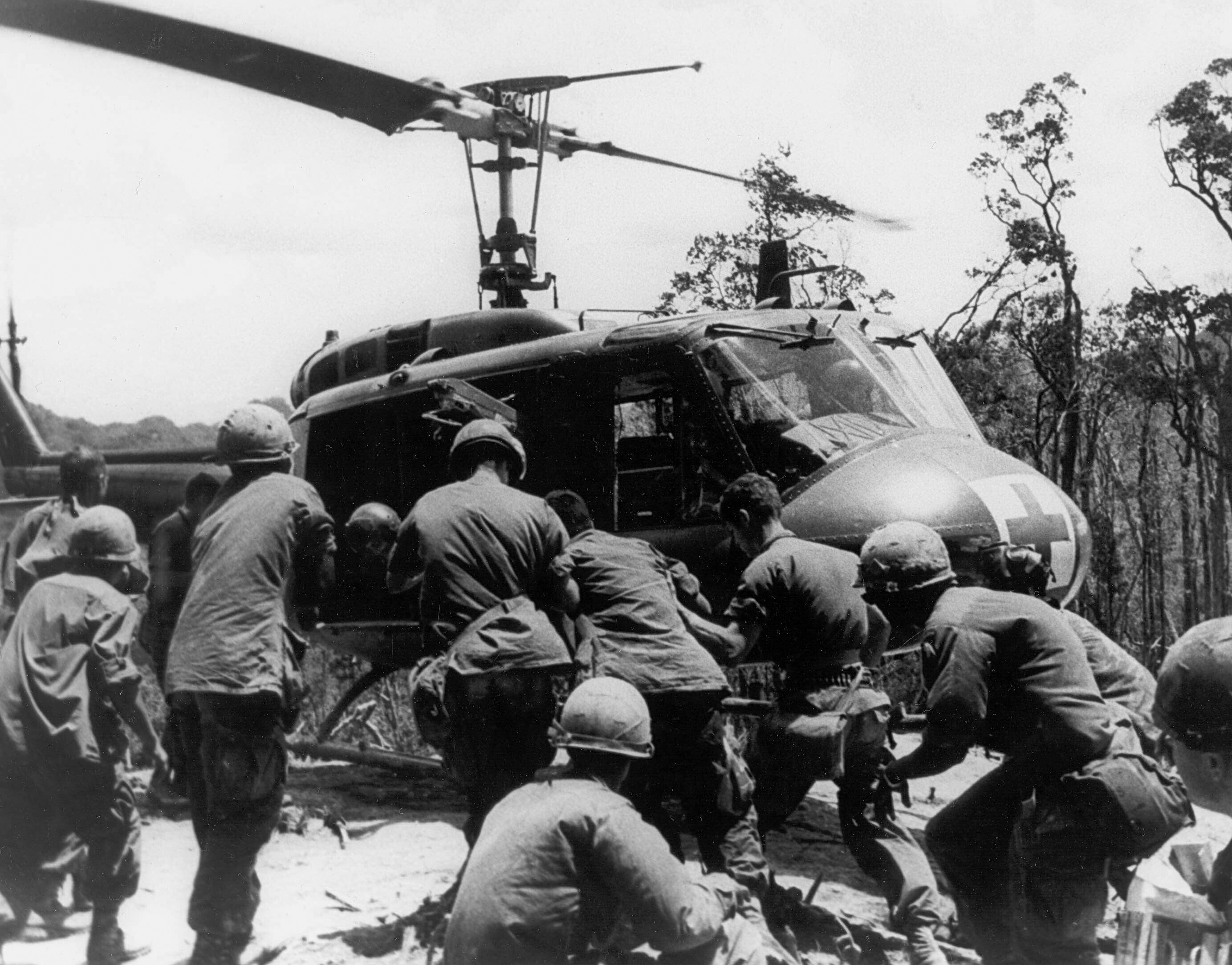
- 101st Airborne wounded are loaded on a medevac helicopter
Date	10 May – 7 June 1969
Location	A Sầu Valley, South Vietnam
Result	US – ARVN victory

Belligerents
United States; South Vietnam	North Vietnam

Commanders and leaders
Melvin Zais; John M. Wright	Ma Vĩnh Lan; Kiều Tam Nguyên

Units involved
(South Vietnam) 1st Infantry Division: 1st Regiment; 3rd Regiment; (United States) 101st Airborne Division; Ten artillery batteries	29th Regiment: 7th Regiment; 8th Regiment; 9th Regiment; 10 support companies

Casualties and losses
(South Vietnam) 31 killed (United States) 113 killed	US body count: 977 killed 5 captured 609 individual and 143 crew‑served weapons recovered

Operation Apache Snow was a joint United States Army (US Army) and Army of the Republic of Vietnam (ARVN) military operation (10 May – 7 June 1969) during the Vietnam War designed to keep pressure on the People's Army of Vietnam (PAVN) units in the A Sầu Valley and prevent them from mounting any attacks on the neighboring coastal provinces.

== Background ==
The A Sầu Valley was an important corridor for the PAVN and Viet Cong (VC), who frequently used it to transport supplies from Laos into South Vietnam as well as employed it as staging area for attacks. Previous sweeps of the valley in Operation Delaware (19 April – 17 May 1968), Operation Dewey Canyon (22 January – 18 March 1969) and Operation Massachusetts Striker (28 February - 8 May 1969) in the preceding year had resulted in over 2,000 enemy casualties, but were unsuccessful at removing the PAVN from the valley.

Apache Snow was planned as an operation involving ten battalions. The initial assault force consisted of troops from the 187th, 501st, and 506th Infantry Regiments of the US 101st Airborne Division, the US 9th Marine Regiment, and the ARVN 1st Division. The plan was to block escape routes into Laos and assault enemy formations and strongholds.

Since March 1969, Military Region Trị Thiên sent three regiments: the 6th (aka Phú Xuân Regiment of Trị Thiên), the 9th, and the 29th (aka 3rd Regiment of 324th Infantry Division) to the A Shau Valley. On 8 May, the 29th Regiment under commander Ma Vĩnh Lan and commissar Kiều Tam Nguyên completed its units deployment and fortifications on Hill 937. Supporting them were 10 companies, including: reconnaissance, sapper, special operation, 82mm mortar, 75mm DKZ, 12.7mm AAA, signals, transportation, medic, and guards units.

== Operation ==
The operation began on 10 May 1969. The PAVN mostly conducted a fighting retreat in the valley. The 29th Regiment eventually made a stand in elaborate previously prepared bunker positions on Hill 937. After ten days of fighting, which involved 11 infantry assaults up Hill 937 primarily by the 3rd Battalion, 187th Infantry (resulting in heavy US losses), US forces managed to destroy the PAVN fortifications and capture the hill. The resulting battle became known to the soldiers as Hamburger Hill, an up-to-date reference to the Korean War Battle of Pork Chop Hill. As the hill had no military significance aside from the presence of the PAVN, it was abandoned by US forces within a few weeks of its being taken.

On 14 May units of the 3rd Brigade, 101st Airborne found 53 PAVN bodies about 2 miles (3.2 km) east of the Laotian border. In the same area on 15 May at 13:15, an element of the 3rd Brigade engaged a PAVN force in a battle that continued until 15:10 when the PAVN broke contact leaving 74 dead while US casualties were 1 killed.

On 16 May at 01:10, units of the 3rd Brigade, while in night defensive positions 13 miles (21 km) northwest of A Sầu received sporadic small arms and RPG fire until 05:30, a sweep of the perimeter at dawn found 14 dead PAVN.

On 18 May at 07:15, units of the 3rd Brigade engaged a PAVN force occupying fortified positions 2 miles east of the Laotian border. Heavy fighting continued with tactical airstrikes and helicopter gunships supporting the 3rd Brigade until contact was lost at 21:00. PAVN losses were 125 killed while US losses were 12 killed.

On 19 May units of the 3rd Brigade engaged a PAVN force occupying fortified positions 2 miles east of the Laotian border. Contact was lost at darkness. PAVN losses were 28 killed and 5 individual and 6 crew-served weapons captured, US losses were 2 killed.

On 20 May units of the 3rd Brigade engaged a PAVN force occupying fortified positions 2 miles east of the Laotian border. The PAVN positions were overrun at 15:30 with PAVN losses of 91 killed and 1 captured US losses of 1 killed. On 21 May Brigade units found the bodies of 48 PAVN soldiers killed by airstrikes or artillery the previous day, together with 37 individual and 13 crew-served weapons. On 22 May Brigade units found 53 PAVN bodies in graves or destroyed fighting positions.

On 23 May, while patrolling around Firebase Airborne, units of the 2nd Battalion, 506th Infantry Regiment lost 4 killed in several separate skirmishes. Company A, 1st Battalion, 506th Infantry Regiment engaged a PAVN force at 09:45 in an engagement that continued until 14:50, following which the Company found 11 bunkers, a rice cache, several weapons and seven PAVN killed. Company B, 1/506th found three bunkers several weapons and three PAVN graves. Company C, 1/506th found the bodies on five PAVN killed the previous day and engaged a PAVN bunker killing one PAVN.

On 24 May 3rd Brigade units discovered a weapons cache containing 47 individual weapons.

On 26 May the 2/506th killed one PAVN and discovered the graves of a further five PAVN. Company B, 1/506th search a bunker complex finding small munitions caches. Company C, 1/506th found 23 bunkers and several small munitions caches.

On 27 May a mortar attack on Firebase Airborne killed four soldiers of the 2/506th. Company C, 2/506th found a supply cache containing 1,400 60/82mm mortar rounds and 200 Rocket-propelled grenades (RPG). Company B, 1/506th found a PAVN grave and Company C destroyed a 25m long corn field.

On 28 May Company C found three AK-47 rifles. On 30 May Company D found an abandoned antiaircraft position comprising five bunkers. On 31 May Company C found a supply cache containing 315 60/82mm mortar rounds and 57 RPG rounds.

On 1 June Company C, 2/506th found a 6,500 pound rice cache and at YD349061 the wreckage of a crashed UH-1D helicopter and the remains of a crewman. Company D, 1/506th found a 60mm mortar and later found four bunkers and living quarters.

On 2 June Company A, 2/506th engaged a group of ten PAVN setting up M18 Claymore mines, two PAVN and one U.S. soldier were killed in the skirmish. Later that day Company C, 2/506th found a 12,900 pound rice cache.

On 3 June Company A, 2/506th found two PAVN graves and Company C found two SKS rifles. Company B, 1/506th conducted an air assault finding two bunkers and later killing one PAVN and capturing two K-50s. On 4 June Company B killed a PAVN entering their night defensive position and captured an AK-47. Later that day Company B found and destroyed antiaircraft position and four mortar positions.

On 5 June Company D, 2/506th engaged two PAVN killing one and capturing an RPG launcher and later found three PAVN graves. Company D, 1/506th found and destroyed five bunkers.

On 6 June Company B, 2/506th was attacked by fire losing one killed. On 7 June Company C found a small supply cache and engaged three PAVN, killing one and following that skirmish located another munitions cache. Company D located another small munitions cache. The 2/506th was withdrawn from the operation at the end of the day. On 7 June the 1/506th was withdrawn from the operation and the operation concluded at midnight.

== Aftermath ==
The operation met its limited objective of pressuring the PAVN forces in the valley. However, the valley continued to be used as staging area for attacks in northern South Vietnam. The US claimed that the month‑long operation accounted for 753 PAVN killed, four prisoners, 272 individual and 43 crew‑served weapons captured and more than 100,000 rounds of ammunition discovered. US losses were 113 killed. The ARVN killed 224 PAVN and captured one and 337 individual and 100 crew-served weapons. Operation Apache Snow resulted in a strategic victory for US and ARVN troops, but the abandonment of Hill 937 was a moral defeat that caused widespread outrage from US forces and the US public.
