= 1963 in the Vietnam War =

← 1962 1964 →
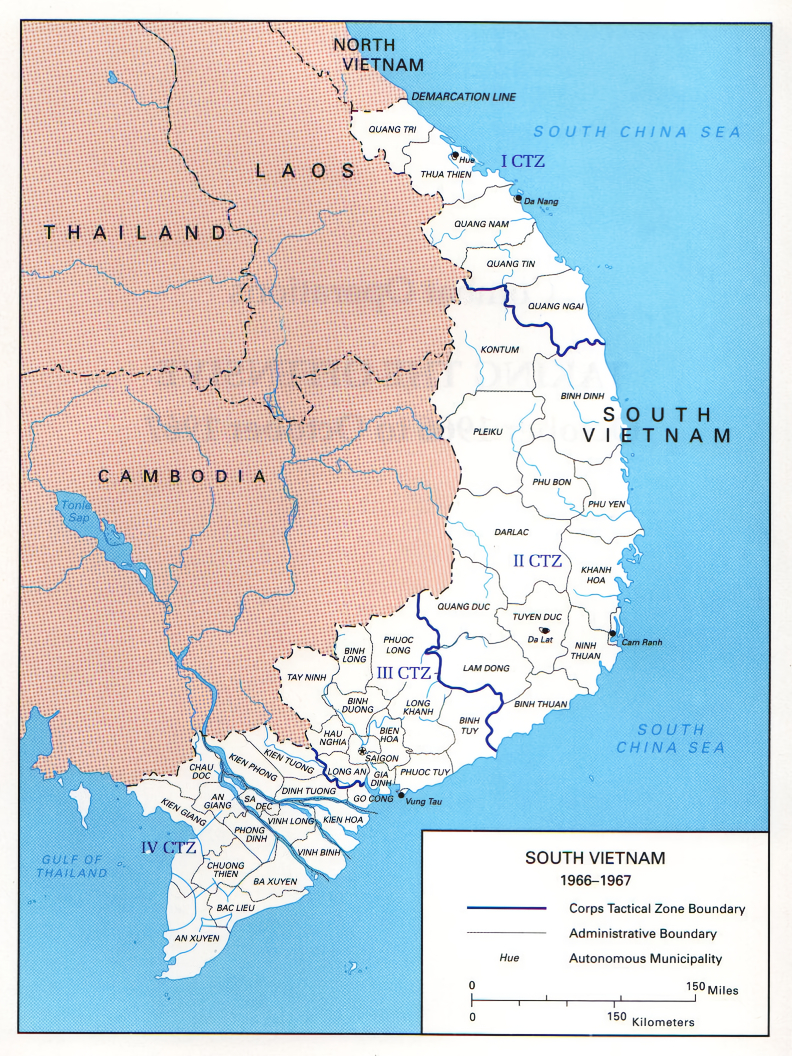
- A map of South Vietnam showing provincial boundaries and names and military zones: I, II, III and IV Corps.
Location	Indochina

Belligerents
Anti-Communist forces: South Vietnam; United States; Kingdom of Laos	Communist forces: North Vietnam (Provisional Revolutionary Government of the Republic of South Vietnam) Viet Cong (Laos) Pathet Lao

Strength
US: 16,732	

Casualties and losses
US: 122 killed South Vietnam: 5,665 killed	North Vietnam: unknown

The defeat of the South Vietnamese Army of the Republic of Vietnam (ARVN) in a battle in January 1963 set off a furious debate in the United States on the progress being made in the war against the Viet Cong (VC) in South Vietnam. Assessments of the war flowing into the higher levels of the U.S. government in Washington, D.C. were wildly inconsistent, some citing an early victory over the VC, others a rapidly deteriorating military situation. Some senior U.S. military officers and White House officials were optimistic; civilians of the Department of State and the Central Intelligence Agency (CIA), junior military officers, and the media were decidedly less so. Near the end of the year, U.S. leaders became more pessimistic about progress in the war.

Although the U.S. denied that it had combat soldiers in South Vietnam, U.S. soldiers routinely participated in combat operations against the VC. The number of U.S. soldiers in South Vietnam rose to more than 16,000 by year's end with 122 combat deaths in just that year.

The President of South Vietnam Ngô Đình Diệm initiated a brutal crack-down on protests by Buddhists against his (largely Roman Catholic) government that caused consternation in the U.S. and concern that the Diệm government was failing. In November, Diệm was overthrown and killed in a coup d'état by his military, with the tacit acquiescence of the United States. A military junta headed by General Dương Văn Minh replaced Diệm. United States President John F. Kennedy was assassinated three weeks later. Lyndon Johnson became President of the United States. Johnson did not make any major changes in Kennedy's policies or team of policy advisers on Vietnam.

== January ==
2 January

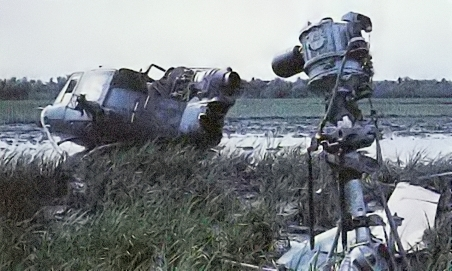
U.S. Army UH-1B gunship shot down in the Battle of Ap Bac

The Battle of Ap Bac was the first major combat victory by the VC against the ARVN and U.S. forces. The battle took place near the hamlet of Ap Bac, 65 km (40 mi) southwest of Saigon in the Mekong Delta. Forces of the ARVN 7th Division, equipped with M113 armored personnel carriers (APCs) and artillery and supported by U.S. helicopters, confronted entrenched elements of the VC 261st and 514th Battalions. The heavily outnumbered VC killed 83 ARVN and three American advisers and shot down five helicopters for the loss of 18 killed. The VC, after several defeats in the Delta, had devised tactics to combat American helicopters and armored vehicles. U.S. Military Assistance Command, Vietnam (MACV) Commander General Paul D. Harkins declared the battle a victory for ARVN because the VC had abandoned the battlefield. American adviser Lieutenant Colonel John Paul Vann who observed and directed the battle from a small airplane, called it a "miserable damn performance" by ARVN because the VC escaped after inflicting heavy casualties.

State Department officer Roger Hilsman, who had counterinsurgency experience in World War II, said after a visit to Vietnam that "things are going much better than they were a year ago" but "not nearly so well as [General] Harkins and others might suggest." Hilsman also talked to General Edward Rowny who had accompanied the ARVN on 20 combat operations. Rowny criticized the ARVN for delaying operations while waiting for air strikes and for its indiscriminate shooting of civilians in bombed-out villages. He was also critical of the lack of United States Air Force (USAF) support for helicopter operations and the micro-management of the war by CINCPAC. He noted that many competent U.S. captains and majors "are becoming strong advocates of fewer sweep operations and more civil and political action programs."

9 to 11 January

At the end of a visit to South Vietnam CINCPAC Admiral Harry D. Felt stated that the VC "face inevitable defeat" and the South Vietnamese were going to win the war.

14 January

In his State of the Union address to Congress President Kennedy said "the spearpoint of aggression has been blunted in South Vietnam."

19 January

General Harkins presented his Comprehensive Plan for the war. He envisioned an increase in South Vietnamese forces (ARVN plus Civil Guard and Self Defense Corps) to 458,500 personnel by mid-1964 and thereafter to decrease, the war presumably winding down. Harkins foresaw that U.S. military personnel in South Vietnam would be reduced to 12,200 by mid 1965 and to 1,500 in mid 1968. MACV would be abolished by 1 July 1966.

25 January

The VC blew up a passenger freight train near Qui Nhơn, killing eight passengers and injuring 15 others.

30 January

Army Chief of Staff General Earle Wheeler returned to Washington after heading a delegation of senior U.S. military officers to South Vietnam. Wheeler's report was highly optimistic. "The situation in South Vietnam has been reoriented, in the space of a year and a half, from a circumstance of near desperation to a condition where victory is now a hopeful prospect." Wheeler commented that press reports about the Battle of Ap Bac had caused "great harm...Public and Congressional opinion in the United States has been influenced toward thinking that the war effort in Vietnam is misguided, lacking in drive, and flouts the counsel of United States advisers. Doubts have been raised as to the courage, the training, the determination and dedication of the Vietnamese armed forces."

== February ==
13 February

U.S. Army adviser Colonel Daniel B. Porter reported to General Harkins from the field that "In many operations against areas of hamlets which are considered to be hard-core VC strongholds, all possibility of surprise is lost by prolonged air strikes and artillery bombardments prior to the landing or movement of troops into the area... The innocent women, children and old people bear the brunt of such bombardments."

== March ==
Chinese military leader Luo Ruiqing visited North Vietnam and said that China would come to its defense if the United States attacked North Vietnam.

4 March

Two Protestant missionaries Elwood Forreston, an American and Gaspart Makil, a Filipino, were shot dead at a VC road block between Saigon and Da Lat. Makil's twin babies were shot and wounded.

8 March

In an issue of ARMY Magazine devoted to guerrilla warfare a letter to the editor explained the U.S. army's lack of attention to counterinsurgency. "The whole field of guerrilla operations was the burial place for the future of any officer who was sincerely interested in the development and application of guerrilla war. The conventionally trained officer appears to feel that guerrilla operations are beneath his dignity...

12 March

Colonel Wilbur Wilson reported that the promising Buon Enao Civilian Irregular Defense Group (CIDG) project was in danger. The South Vietnamese government was confiscating weapons from the Montagnard self-defense forces created and armed by the CIA in Buon Enao. He said that "the effectiveness of the Buon Enao concept will decrease sharply throughout all the highlands" and "VC incidents will increase rapidly once the VC learn that...food, manpower, and freedom of movement can be obtained without combat." MACV did not respond positively to the concern and continued shifting United States Special Forces soldiers away from pacification projects, also called hearts and minds programs, such as Buon Enao into purely military operations against the VC. By the end of 1963, Darlac Province where Buon Enao was located had "one of the highest rates of Communist activity in the country."

20 March

General Harkins and MACV issued a report stating that "barring greatly increased resupply and reinforcement of the Viet Cong by infiltration, the military phase of the war can be virtually won in 1963." This optimistic statement conflicted with negative assessments coming in from a large number of military advisers in the field

27 March

Prime Minister Phạm Văn Đồng of North Vietnam told a Polish diplomat that a Geneva Conference should be convened to establish a neutral coalition government in South Vietnam. Đồng said that the U.S. could thus "withdraw with honor satisfied" and that the unification of North and South Vietnam would be accomplished only gradually.

== April ==
3 April

John Paul Vann departed Vietnam for an assignment in the United States. Vann met with and briefed many officers at the Pentagon about the military situation in Vietnam. He was invited to brief the Joint Chiefs of Staff (JCS) on 8 July. However, his briefing was cancelled at the last minute, apparently by the Chairman of the Joint Chiefs of Staff General Maxwell Taylor. Vann's proposed briefing to the JCS was at odds with what General Harkins was telling Washington. He planned to say that the body counts ARVN reported of VC killed were inflated and included many non-combatants and that the indiscriminate use of artillery and air strikes was alienating the Vietnamese population.

The VC threw two grenades into a variety show performance at a private school near Long Xuyen, An Giang Province, killing a teacher and two other adults.

4 April

The VC threw grenades into an audience attending an outdoor motion picture showing in Cao Lanh village in the Mekong Delta, killing four persons and wounding 11.

17 April

A National Intelligence Estimate by the intelligence community of the U.S. stated: "We believe that Communist progress has been blunted...The Viet Cong can be contained militarily and...further progress can be made in expanding the area of government control and in creating greater security in the countryside." CIA Director John A. McCone had rejected an earlier draft which had been far less optimistic. He directed the analysts to seek out the views of senior U.S. military and civilian policymakers, most of whom were far more optimistic. The earlier draft had read: "The struggle in South Vietnam will be protracted and costly [because] very great weaknesses remain and will be difficult to surmount." The weaknesses of the South Vietnamese government were "lack of aggressive and firm leadership at all levels of command, poor morale among the troops, lack of trust between peasant and soldier, poor tactical use of available forces, a very inadequate intelligence system, and obvious Communist penetration of the South Vietnamese military organization. The shift in the emphasis of the report from pessimistic to optimistic has been cited by CIA studies as an example of distorting intelligence to suit the political wishes of senior government officials.

25 April

A seven person New Zealand surgical team arrived at Qui Nhon to operate on civilians at the Binh Dinh Province Hospital. The surgical team would remain there until 1975.

== May ==
China's second most important leader Liu Shaoqi visited North Vietnam. He told Ho Chi Minh and other North Vietnamese leaders that they could count on China as "the strategic rear" if the war expanded. Between 1956 and 1963, China provided about 320 million yuan (about 130 million U.S. dollars) in military assistance to North Vietnam, including arms, ammunition, trucks, planes, and ships.

The Joint Chiefs of Staff directed Admiral Harry D. Felt, to produce a plan for covert military raids in North Vietnam known as Operation Plan 34-63 (OPLAN 34–63). It would later become known as Operation 34A (OPLAN 34A).

1 May

A U.S. Army (Pacific) intelligence bulletin was titled "Enemy Presses Hard on Shaky South Vietnam Regime." The report said that VC attacks during the month of March had reached an all-time high of 1,861 and that the attacks were larger in scale and dispersed over a larger area than previously.

8 May

South Vietnamese troops opened fire on Buddhist protesters in the city of Huế, killing nine persons and beginning the Buddhist crisis. The Buddhists were gathered to protest a ban on the Buddhist flag to celebrate the Buddha's birthday. About 70 percent of South Vietnamese were Buddhists or adhered to related religions, although President Diệm, his family, and most of his close political allies were Catholic, about 10 percent of the population.

10 May

In response to the shootings in Huế, Buddhist leader Thích Trí Quang proclaimed a five-point "manifesto of the monks" that demanded freedom to fly the Buddhist flag, religious equality between Buddhists and Catholics, compensation for the victims' families, an end to arbitrary arrests, and punishment for the officials responsible. The request was formalized on 13 May, and talks began on 15 May.

12 May

Returning to the U.S. after a briefing from General Harkins on the military situation in South Vietnam, Secretary of Defense Robert McNamara was quoted by The New York Times as saying he was "tremendously encouraged" by the military progress made in South Vietnam. The newspaper article was titled "McNamara Says Aid to Saigon Is at Peak and Will Level Off."

Illustrating the strains in the relationship between President Diệm and the U.S. government, Diệm was reported in The Washington Post as saying that "South Vietnam would like to see half of the 12,000 to 13,000 American military stationed here leave the country."

16 May

The U.S. Army issued guidance to its personnel in South Vietnam for dealing with the media. "Your approach to the questions of the press should emphasize the positive aspects of your activities and avoid gratuitous criticism. Emphasize the feeling of achievement, the hopes for the future, and instances of outstanding individual or personal credibility by gilding the lily. As songwriter Johnny Mercer put it, "You've got to accentuate the positive and eliminate the negative."

18 May

President Diệm agreed a modest compensation package of US$7000 for the families of the victims of the shootings in Huế. Diệm also agreed to dismiss those responsible for the shootings, but on the grounds that the officials had failed to maintain order, rather than any responsibility for the deaths of the protesters. He resolutely continued to blame the VC.

23 May

The VC mined the main northern rail line, killing five civilian passengers. Twelve other passengers and crew were injured.

30 May

More than 500 monks demonstrated in front of the National Assembly in Saigon. The Buddhists evaded a ban on public assembly by hiring four buses and filling up and pulling the blinds down. They drove around the city before the convoy stopped at the designated time and the monks disembarked. This was the first time that an open protest had been held in Saigon against Diệm in his eight years of rule. They unfurled banners and sat down for four hours before disbanding and returning to the pagodas to begin a nationwide 48-hour hunger strike organized by the Buddhist patriarch Thich Tinh Khiet.

31 May

Two explosions set off by VC on bicycles killed two Vietnamese and wounded ten others in Saigon.

== June ==
3 June

The Huế chemical attacks occurred when ARVN soldiers poured liquid chemicals from Tear gas grenades onto the heads of praying Buddhists in Huế. The Buddhists were protesting against religious discrimination by the regime of President Diệm. Sixty-seven people were hospitalized for blistering of the skin and respiratory ailments.

11 June

A Vietnamese Mahayana Buddhist monk, Hòa thượng Thích Quảng Đức, burned himself to death at a busy street intersection in Saigon. He was protesting the persecution of Buddhists by Diệm's government. Associated Press (AP) photographer Malcolm Browne took a photograph of the incident which was published on the front page of nearly every newspaper in the world.

16 June

In an attempt to resolve the Buddhist crisis, a Joint Communique was signed between President Diệm and Buddhist leaders.

17 June

Outside Xá Lợi Pagoda, shortly after 9:00 a.m, a crowd of around 2,000 people were confronted by police who still ringed the pagoda despite the Joint Communique. A riot eventually broke out and police attacked the crowd with tear gas, fire hoses, clubs and gunfire. One protester was killed and scores more injured. Moderates from both sides urged calm while some government officials blamed "extremist elements". An AP story described the riot as "the most violent anti-Government outburst in South Vietnam in years".

== July ==
7 July

The secret police of Ngô Đình Nhu, the brother of President Diệm, attacked a group of journalists who were covering Buddhist protests on the ninth anniversary of Diem's rise to power. Peter Arnett of the AP was punched in the nose, but the quarrel quickly ended after David Halberstam of The New York Times, being much taller than Nhu's men, counterattacked and caused the secret police to retreat. Arnett and his colleague Malcolm Browne, were later accosted by police at their office and taken away for questioning on suspicion of attacking police officers.

17 July

At a press conference, President Kennedy said of South Vietnam. "We are not going to withdraw...for us to withdraw would mean a collapse not only of South Vietnam, but of Southeast Asia. So we are going to stay there."

23 July

At a conference of U.S. military leaders in Hawaii, Secretary McNamara called for a withdrawal of 1,000 American military personnel from South Vietnam by the end of 1963, a more rapid withdrawal than had been proposed by General Harkins on January 19.

== August ==
12 August

Henry Cabot Lodge Jr., a Republican from a prominent political family, was sworn in as the new U.S. Ambassador to Vietnam, replacing Frederick Nolting.

14 August

In a letter to The New York Times, Madame Nhu, sister-in-law of President Diệm, defended her strong criticisms of protesting Buddhist monks. She wrote, "I would clap hands at seeing another monk barbecue show, for one can not be responsible for the madness of others."

The Joint Chiefs of Staff endorsed OPLAN 34–63.

21 August

President Diệm declared martial law. His brother Ngô Đình Nhu sent troops loyal to him to raid Buddhist pagodas all over the country. More than 1,000 Buddhists and others were arrested.

24 August

The State Department sent Cable 243 to Ambassador Lodge in Saigon stating: "US Government cannot tolerate situation in which power lies in Nhu's hands. Diệm must be given chance to rid himself of Nhu and his coterie and replace them with best military and political personalities available. If, in spite of all of your efforts, Diệm remains obdurate and refuses, then we must face the possibility that Diệm himself cannot be preserved...You may also tell appropriate military commanders we will give them direct support in any interim period of breakdown central government mechanism." The cable was controversial within the Kennedy Administration as not all the major policy makers had been consulted before it was dispatched. Historian John W. Newman described it as "the single most controversial cable of the Vietnam War." After an acrimonious debate at the White House concerning U.S. support for a coup d'état to overthrow Diệm, President Kennedy said to participants, "My government is falling apart." Outgoing U.S. Ambassador Frederick Nolting, a supporter of Diệm, commented later about "the confusion, vacillation and lack of coordination in the U.S. Government." He criticized President Kennedy "for his failure to take control."

29 August

The President of France Charles de Gaulle made a public statement implying that North and South Vietnam should be united and "independent of outside influences." The Kennedy Administration was immediately concerned about the impact of the De Gaulle pronouncement and acted to reduce its impact. Kennedy would say on September 2 that De Gaulle was not being helpful and that De Gaulle said, in effect, "why don't we all just go home and leave the world to those who are our enemies."

31 August

The CIA reported to Washington that "this particular coup is finished." General Harkins said that ARVN generals "were not ready" to stage a coup. At a White House meeting, Vice President Lyndon Johnson said he had never been sympathetic with the proposal to change the government in South Vietnam by plotting with ARVN generals. Now that the generals had failed to organize a coup, he thought we ought to reestablish ties to the Diệm government as quickly as possible and get forward with the war against the VC. "We must", he said, "stop playing cops and robbers."

== September ==
2 September

President Kennedy had a televised interview with journalist Walter Cronkite. Kennedy said that, while the U.S. could help, it was the Vietnamese who had to win the war. He added, "I don't agree with those who say we should withdraw. That would be a great mistake." He also stated that "I don't think that the war can be won unless the people support the war effort and, in my opinion, in the last two months, the government has gotten out of touch with the people."

3 September

The Battle of Go Cong was a small battle after VC General Staff called for "another Ap Bac" on South Vietnamese forces. The battle resulted in 66 VC killed and 91 captured in a victory for the ARVN.

9 September

The Joint Chiefs of Staff endorsed a modified version of OPLAN 34–63.

In another televised interview Kennedy stated that he opposed reducing aid to South Vietnam as it might bring about a collapse similar to the Kuomintang at the end of the Chinese Civil War.

10 September

Marine Corps General Victor Krulak and Department of State official Joseph Mendenhall briefed President Kennedy on their recent visit to South Vietnam. Krulak said that the war could be won "if the current U.S. military and sociological programs are pursued." Mendenhall said the South Vietnamese government had broken down by the "pervasive atmosphere and fear and hate arising from the police reign of terror." Kennedy commented, "You two did visit the same country, didn't you?" At the same meeting Rufus Phillips, head of the USAID mission in South Vietnam, said that the war in the Mekong Delta was going poorly. The strategic hamlets in the Delta were being chewed to pieces by the VC. Krulak disagreed, saying that only 0.2 percent of strategic hamlets had been overrun by the VC. John Mecklin, of the U.S. Embassy in Saigon said that "conditions in Vietnam have deteriorated so badly that the U.S. would be drawing to a three card straight [i.e. accepting an unlikely probability] to gamble its interests there on anything short of an ultimate willingness to use U.S. combat troops."

11 September

Ambassador Lodge cabled Washington his estimate of the current situation in South Vietnam: "It is worsening rapidly...the time has arrived for the US to use what effective sanctions it has to bring about the fall of the existing government and the installation of another" and "study should be given [to] the suspension of aid." A meeting later that day between President Kennedy and his advisers was indecisive."

12 September

At a press conference, President Kennedy said the U.S. opinion of the war was, "What helps to win the war, we support; what interferes with the war effort, we oppose...We are not there to see a war lost.

British counterinsurgency expert Robert Grainger Ker Thompson told Ambassador Lodge that Hanoi was willing to make major concessions to ensure an American withdrawal from South Vietnam. Other diplomats with high-level contacts in Hanoi believed the same.

13 September

Ambassador Lodge cabled Washington recommending study be given to the U.S. response if Ngô Đình Nhu, in the course of negotiating with North Vietnam, should ask the U.S. to leave South Vietnam or to make a major reduction in forces.

18 September

Polish diplomat Mieczyslaw Maneli reported to Warsaw and the Soviet Union that "Saigon is buzzing with rumors about secret contacts between Diệm-Nhu and Ho Chi Minh." Many diplomats in Hanoi and Saigon believed that Nhu, the President's brother, was seeking an accommodation with North Vietnam because he had concluded that the U.S. was going to remove him from power.

23 September

Three VC sappers penetrated Nha Trang Air Base and destroyed two C-47s with Satchel charges.

== October ==
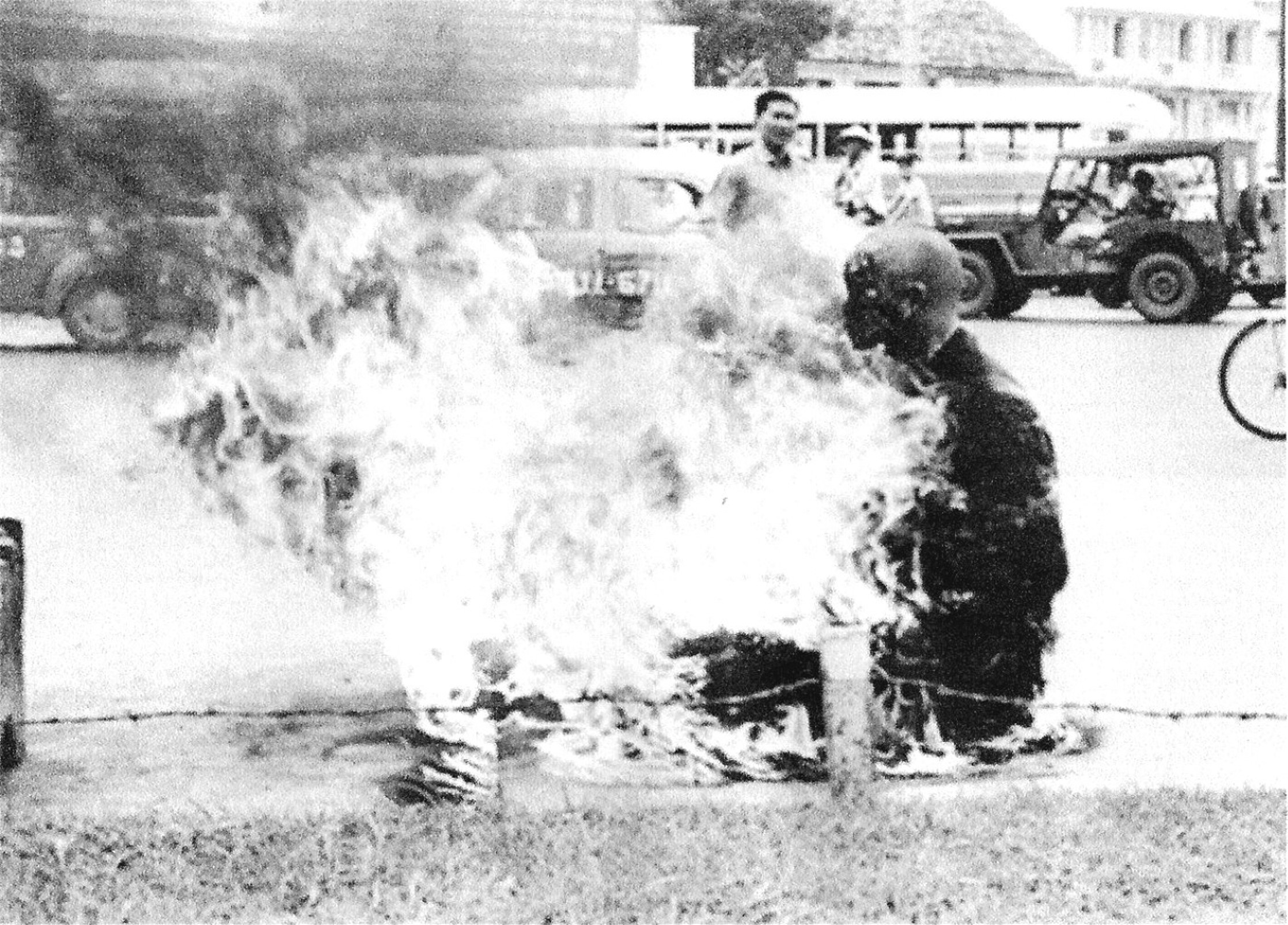
A Buddhist monk commits suicide by burning at the Central Market in Saigon, October 5, 1963

2 October

Secretary of Defense McNamara and Chairman of the Joint Chiefs of Staff General Taylor returned from a fact-finding trip to South Vietnam and submitted their report to President Kennedy in a meeting at the White House. McNamara and Taylor concluded that "the military campaign has made great progress and continues to progress" and that "there is no solid evidence of the possibility of a successful coup." A White House statement said that "Secretary McNamara and General Taylor reported their judgment that the major part of the U.S. military task can be completed by the end of 1965, although there may be a continuing requirement for a limited number of U.S. training personnel. They reported that by the end of this year, the U.S. program for training Vietnamese should have progressed to the point where 1,000 U.S. military personnel assigned to South Viet-Nam can be withdrawn."

American troops in South Vietnam at this time numbered 16,732.

5 October

Cable 534 was sent to Ambassador Lodge in South Vietnam from the Department of State with instructions for Lodge to press President Diệm on a number of issues. Pending favorable action of the part of Diệm, some economic aid programs would be suspended which, in the view of the State Department, would not have an adverse impact on the war against the VC for two to four months. Among other things, Diệm was to be enjoined to cease criticism of the United States and to focus on a serious military situation in the Mekong Delta. His strategy should be to hold territory and protect the rural population rather than having the ARVN undertake military sweeps of only temporary value.

The Commercial Import Program was suspended by the US in the wake of the McNamara Taylor mission. The report concluded that Diệm was not concentrating on fighting the insurrection but was instead preoccupied with suppressing Buddhist protests. One of the reasons for the suspension was to give military officers a signal that Washington was unhappy with Diệm and therefore increase the prospects of a coup, as well as to try and foster urban resentment towards Diệm among those that had previously benefited from the CIP. Another was that Diệm might change his policy direction in accordance with US wishes, although they considered this to be unlikely.

7 October

Amid worsening relations, outspoken South Vietnamese First Lady Madame Ngo Dinh Nhu arrived in the US for a speaking tour, continuing a flurry of attacks on the Kennedy administration.

11 October

In National Security Action Memorandum 263 (NSAM 263) President Kennedy ordered the withdrawal of 1,000 American troops from South Vietnam without any public announcement of the withdrawal.

16 October

The VC exploded mines under two civilian buses in Kien Hoa and Quảng Tín Provinces, killing 18 civilians and wounding 23.

19 October

The New York Times echoed several other publications by urging that the Kennedy Administration not reject the idea of a neutral South Vietnam.

22 October

The Army Attaché Colonel Jones of the U.S. Embassy met with ARVN Colonel Nguyen Khuong. Khuong said that "A small, powerful group of military officers who can control sufficient forces are prepared to launch a coup against the Diệm government. He outlined how they can assassinate Diệm almost at will, replace corrupt/incompetent military, cabinet, and province officials, prosecute the war against the VC, recall political refugees from France/USA and establish a new government. While this group fears Diệm, they especially fear Mr. [Ngô Dinh] Nhu who they consider will surely succeed Diệm and who will seek reunification of North and South Vietnam through neutralist solution.

The State Department in Washington issued a secret report titled "Statistics on the War Effort in South Vietnam Show Unfavorable Trends." The report said that "since July 1963, the trend in Viet Cong casualties, weapons losses and defections has been downward while the number of Viet Cong armed attacks and other incidents has been upward. A series of telegrams from Ambassador Lodge to President Kennedy was equally pessimistic, stating, that we are "doing little more than holding our own." The Department of Defense was furious that Lodge and the State Department were contradicting previous reports by Generals Taylor and Harkins.

25 October

Ambassador Lodge cabled Washington saying "We should not thwart a coup for two reasons. First, it seems at least an even bet that the next government would not bungle and stumble as much as the present one has."

28 October

Vietnamese coup plotter General Trần Văn Đôn met with Colonel Lucien Conein of the U.S. Embassy. Đôn said that he had assurances from Ambassador Lodge that Conein was the proper channel to discuss coup plans. Đôn said that he and his fellow Generals wished to do everything possible to avoid American involvement in the coup. He stated emphatically that other Americans should quit talking about the coup with ARVN officers.

29 October

Washington cabled request for Ambassador Lodge, through Colonel Conein, to get additional information about the upcoming coup in South Vietnam. The U.S. position was that the "burden of proof must be on coup group to show a substantial possibility of quick success; otherwise, we should discourage them from proceeding since a miscalculation could result in jeopardizing U.S. position in Southeast Asia."

30 October

Ambassador Lodge responded to Washington's request for more information about coup plans by saying that the U.S. did "not have the power to delay or discourage a coup." He agreed that "a miscalculation could jeopardize" the U.S. position in Southeast Asia but added "We also run tremendous risks by doing nothing." Lodge noted that General Harkins did not concur with his opinion. Harkins had previously expressed opposition to a coup against Diệm. A telegram from Washington to Ambassador Lodge took exception to his view that the U.S. could not delay or discourage a coup, but instructed him to discourage a coup unless in his judgement it had a good chance of success. The instruction stated that "It is not in the interest of USG to be or appear to be either the instrument of the existing government or the instrument of coup...But once a coup under responsible leadership has begun, and within these restrictions, it is in the interest of the U.S. Government that it should succeed.

== November ==
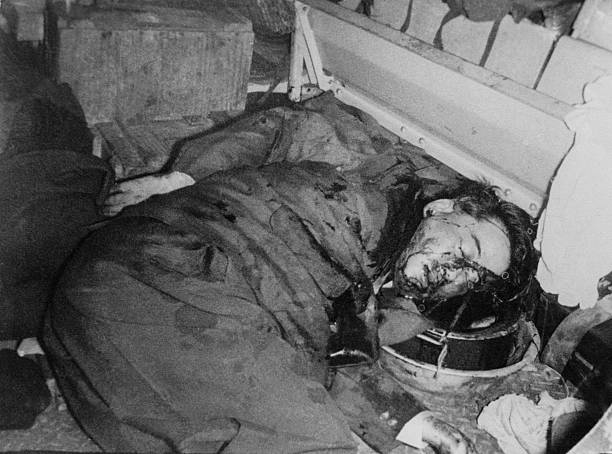
The body of Diệm in the back of the APC, having been executed on the way to military headquarters.

1 November

General Harkins notified Washington that the coup d'état against the Diệm government was underway.

2 November

The arrest and assassination of Ngô Đình Diệm and his younger brother Ngô Đình Nhu marked the culmination of a successful coup led by General Dương Văn Minh. Diệm and Nhu were arrested and then killed in an armoured personnel carrier by ARVN officers.

Ambassador Lodge was authorized by the State Department to release funds for aid projects to the new Government of South Vietnam. The funding of the projects had been frozen by the U.S. to pressure the Diệm government to undertake reforms.

6 November

President Kennedy sent a letter to Ambassador Lodge congratulating him for his work in Saigon.

9 November

Three grenades were thrown in Saigon, injuring a total of 16 persons, including four children.

11 November

North Vietnam said that the Kennedy Administration had sanctioned the coup against President Diệm because he failed to crush the VC rebellion. Diệm had been too independent and Washington replaced him with a more pliable leader to gain control over South Vietnam.

16 November

President Kennedy's plans to withdraw 1,000 American soldiers from South Vietnam became public as General Charles J. Timmes announced the plan in Saigon.

20 November

Secretary McNamara met with military and civilian leaders in Hawaii. The assessment of the progress of the war in South Vietnam was much more negative than in previous Hawaii meetings. The plan to withdraw 1,000 soldiers became "an accounting exercise" in which the replacement of personnel was slowed down to reduce temporarily the number of American military personnel in South Vietnam. Of the combat troops, only one platoon (about 50 men) of Marines was to be withdrawn.

OPLAN-63 was discussed at the meeting. CIA director William Colby stated that the plan would not work, but McNamara rejected his advice. The CIA was ordered to assist the military in a larger program of covert military raids on North Vietnam.

21 November

National Security Action Memorandum 273 was drafted by McGeorge Bundy to reflect the views about the war coming out of the Hawaii meeting. President Kennedy apparently never saw the draft nor discussed its contents.

22 November

President Kennedy was assassinated in Dallas, Texas. Lyndon Johnson become President of the U.S.

The Central Committee of the Communist Party of Vietnam met in emergency session to consider the implications of the fall of the Diệm government. First Secretary Lê Duẩn made a fiery speech saying "We are strong, while the enemy is weak...the strategy of revolution should not be a defensive one." Rather an offensive strategy should be adopted "to smash one by one the war policies of imperialism heading by the United States until its war plans are completely smashed." Lê Duẩn's speech won the approval of the members of the Central Committee who had previously been cautious about helping the VC and pursuing an aggressive policy in South Vietnam. Ho Chi Minh, a moderate, reportedly removed himself from the debate.

An AP report on the Honolulu conference said that U.S. officials believe it may take six "months to tell whether the overthrow of the Diệm regime has brought victory in the anti-Communists war closer."

24 November

In the Battle of Hiep Hoa, a CIDG base was overrun in Hau Nghia on the Plain of Reeds west of Saigon. Five hundred VC attacked the base, manned by 5 U.S. Special Forces soldiers and 200 local militia. One of the Americans was wounded and the other four went missing, one of whom, Isaac Camacho, became the first American to escape from VC captivity. Forty-one of the local militiamen were killed. This was the first U.S. Special Forces base to be captured by the VC.

The VC hit 24 U.S. and RVNAF aircraft and helicopters, destroying five, the highest number in the war to date.

President Johnson held his first meeting on Vietnam with senior advisers, the same group with whom former President Kennedy had often met. According to accounts, Johnson was aggressive at the meeting. "I am not going to lose Vietnam" he reportedly said and told Ambassador Lodge to tell the generals heading the government in South Vietnam that "Lyndon Johnson intends to stand by our word." He also reportedly said that he had "never been happy with our operations in Vietnam" and the "serious dissension and divisions" within the U.S. government.

26 November

Johnson approved National Security Action Memorandum 273 (NSAM 273). The NSAM affirmed the U.S., commitment of helping South Vietnam "win their contest against the externally directed and supported Communist conspiracy." There was one substantive change in the text previously drafted by McGeorge Bundy on November 21. Kennedy had previously agreed with South Vietnamese covert attacks against North Vietnam; the newly drafted paragraph 7 in the NSAM called for "prompt submission of plans" for covert U.S. attacks on North Vietnam. Regarding Kennedy's plan for the withdrawal of 1,000 U.S. soldiers by the end of 1963, the NSAM said only, "The objectives of the United States with respect to the withdrawal of U. S. military personnel remain as stated in the White House statement of October 2, 1963."

November - January 1964

The Battle of Lak Sao was the culmination of a Royal Lao Army and Forces Armées Neutralistes offensive to engage PAVN forces in northern Laos. The operation met stiff resistance and they were forced to retreat.

== December ==
The North Vietnamese Politburo passed Resolution 9 which called for an all-out effort to "seize a favorable opportunity by massing our forces to resolutely seek to win decisive victories during the next few years." The strategic mission of the VC/PAVN in the South would be to "shatter the puppet army, the primary tool of the enemy regime, in order to create conditions that will allow us to carry out the general offensive–general uprising to overthrow the reactionary government in South Vietnam." before sizable U.S. forces could be introduced.

2 December

The South Vietnamese government suspended the Strategic Hamlet Program, effectively ending it. A U.S. AID official reported that three-fourths of the Strategic Hamlets in Long An province had already been destroyed by the VC or the inhabitants themselves.

7 December

Senator Mike Mansfield, considered Congress's expert on Southeast Asia, wrote a memo to President Johnson suggesting that a neutral Vietnam be negotiated. Mansfield disagreed with Johnson's other advisers "that the war can be won at a limited expenditure of American lives and resources somewhere commensurate with our national interests in south Viet Nam."

12 December

Secretary of Defense McNamara cabled Ambassador Lodge that he was coming to visit South Vietnam "to make clear to North Vietnam that the U.S. will not accept a communist victory in South Vietnam and we will escalate the conflict to whatever level is required to insure their defeat."

15 December

By this date, the CIA and MACV had worked out a modified version of OPLAN 34-63 known as OPLAN 34A.

18 December

McNamara in South Vietnam requested to visit a district of the country in which the former Diệm government of South Vietnam claimed 18 strategic hamlets were located; he discovered than none of the 18 existed. McNamara had gone from being optimistic about the progress of the war in October to pessimistic in December.

21 December

John McCone Director of the CIA said, "It is abundantly clear that statistics received over the last year or more from the GVN [Government of Vietnam] officials and reported by the US mission on which we gauged the trend of the war were grossly in error.

Secretary of Defense McNamara said in a report to the President that, "Current trends [in South Vietnam], unless reversed in the next 2–3 months, will lead to neutralization at best and more likely to a Communist-controlled state." He said that the U.S. must "give the Viet Cong and their supporters early and unmistakable signals that their success is a transitory thing."

31 December

One hundred and twenty-two American soldiers were killed in the war in 1963. 15,894 U.S. military personnel were in South Vietnam on this date, down from a high of 16,752 in October before the 1,000 person reduction in U.S. military presence was announced. The South Vietnamese armed forces suffered 5,665 killed in action, 25 percent more than the total killed in the previous year.

North Vietnam had infiltrated about 40,000 cadres and fighters into South Vietnam over a period of several years. They made up about 50 percent of the VC military and 80 percent of political operatives and technical personnel. They consisted mostly of southerners who had migrated north in 1954–1955 to reside in a communist state rather than remain in South Vietnam. Units of the People's Army of Vietnam had not yet been dispatched to South Vietnam.

31 December-4 January

An ARVN 5th Division operation against the VC's Boi Loi and Long Nguyen bases in Tay Ninh and Binh Duong provinces resulted in the ambush of the 32nd Ranger Battalion. South Vietnamese forces lost nine killed, 45 wounded, 31 missing, and 32 weapons lost mostly from the 32nd Rangers.
