= 1962 in the Vietnam War =

← 1961 1963 →
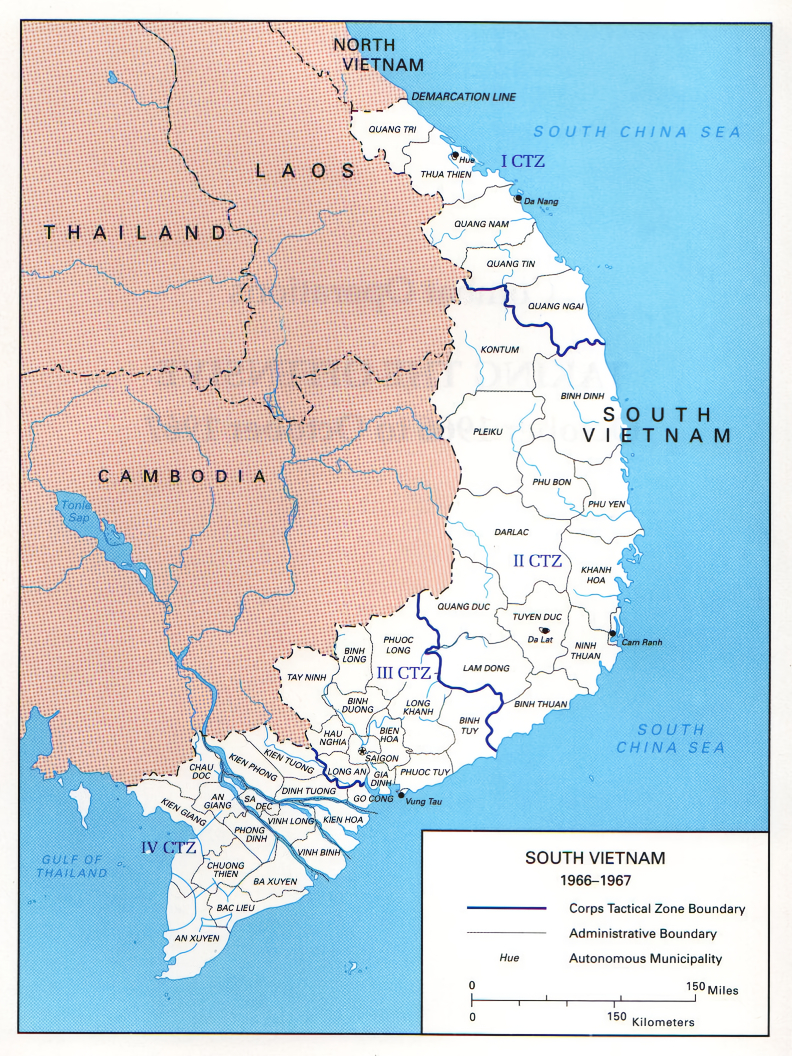
- A map of South Vietnam showing provincial boundaries and names and military zones: I, II, III, and IV Corps.
Location	Indochina

Belligerents
Anti-Communist forces: South Vietnam; United States; Laos Kingdom of Laos	Communist forces: North Vietnam; Republic of South Vietnam Viet Cong; Laos Pathet Lao

Casualties and losses
US: 53 killed South Vietnam: 4,457 killed	Unknown

The Viet Cong (VC) insurgency expanded in South Vietnam in 1962. U.S. military personnel flew combat missions and accompanied South Vietnamese soldiers in ground operations to find and defeat the insurgents. Secrecy was the official U.S. policy concerning the extent of U.S. military involvement in South Vietnam. The commander of Military Assistance Command, Vietnam (MACV), General Paul D. Harkins, projected optimism that progress was being made in the war, but that optimism was refuted by the concerns expressed by a large number of more junior officers and civilians. Several prominent magazines, newspapers and politicians in the U.S. questioned the military strategy the U.S. was pursuing in support of the South Vietnamese government of President Ngô Đình Diệm. Diệm created the Strategic Hamlet Program as his top priority to defeat the VC. The program intended to cluster South Vietnam's rural dwellers into defended villages where they would be provided with government social services.

North Vietnam increased its support to the VC, infiltrating men and supplies into South Vietnam via the Ho Chi Minh Trail. North Vietnam proposed negotiations to neutralize South Vietnam as had been done in neighboring Laos and Cambodia, but the failure of the Laotian neutrality agreement doomed that initiative.

U.S. analyses and statements about progress and problems with the war often conflicted or contradicted each other which is reflected in this article.

== January ==
2 January

Two South Vietnamese technicians working in the government's anti-malaria program, Pham Van Hai and Nguyen Van Thach, were killed by VC with machetes, 12 miles (19 km) south of Saigon.

3 January

The first United States Air Force (USAF) military transport aircraft arrived in South Vietnam under Operation Mule Train. The aircraft would be used to transport South Vietnamese soldiers.

4 January

Deputy Secretary of Defense Roswell Gilpatric recommended to General Lyman Lemnitzer, the Chairman of the Joint Chiefs of Staff, that for military operations involving Americans in South Vietnam The Pentagon develop a "suitable cover story, or stories, a public explanation, a statement of no comment...for approval of the Secretary of Defense."

10 January

The first Operation Ranch Hand mission began. Agent Orange defoliants were sprayed from USAF aircraft along several miles of Highway 15 leading from the port of Vũng Tàu to Bien Hoa Air Base northeast of Saigon. Although the United States wished to keep the use of defoliants secret, the South Vietnamese government announced publicly that defoliants supplied by the U.S. were being used to kill vegetation near highway routes.

15 January

Secretary of Defense Robert McNamara met with his top military advisers. CINCPAC intelligence told him that the VC now numbered 20,000 to 25,000 and were increasing by 1,000 per month after casualties. South Vietnam's armed forces had suffered more than 1,000 casualties in the previous month, most by the paramilitary Self Defense Corps. McNamara ordered sending 40,000 M-1 carbines to South Vietnam to arm the Self Defense Corps and the Civil Guard, although those two organizations were the sources of many of the VC's captured weapons.

McNamara pressed for a "clear and hold" operation in a single South Vietnamese province. Clear and hold envisioned the ARVN securing the province followed by civic and political action to exclude the VC permanently. Military Assistance Advisory Group (MAAG) chief General Lionel C. McGarr proposed instead using two ARVN divisions in a conventional military sweep focused on killing VC but without the follow-up to hold the area.

20 January

Admiral Harry D. Felt, CINCPAC commander, authorized American advisers to accompany South Vietnamese military forces on combat operations.

January–May 1963

In the Battle of Luang Namtha the People's Army of Vietnam (PAVN) and Pathet Lao seized control of northwestern Laos from the Royal Lao Army.

== February ==
2 February

Roger Hilsman, a U.S. State Department official with World War II experience in guerrilla war, submitted a paper entitled "A Strategic Concept for South Vietnam" to President Kennedy and General Taylor. Drawing heavily on British adviser Robert Grainger Ker Thompson's plan for strategic hamlets, Hilsman said "the struggle for South Vietnam...is essentially a battle for control of the villages." He stated that "the problem presented by the Viet Cong is a political and not a military problem, and that to be effective counterinsurgency "must provide the people and the villages with protection and physical security." Hilsman's solution to this problem was similar to that of Thompson's. Hilsman advocated that the ARVN adopt tactics of mobility, surprise, and small unit operations. Conventional warfare such as the use of artillery or aerial bombardment to soften up the enemy will "only give advance warning of an operation, permit the Viet Cong to escape and inevitably result in the death of uncommitted or wavering civilians whose support is essential for the Viet Cong's ultimate defeat."

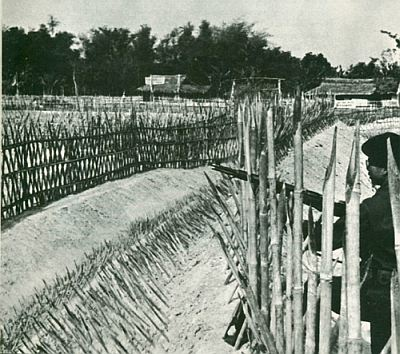
A strategic hamlet in South Vietnam.

3 February

Diệm created by presidential decree the strategic hamlet program headed by his brother, Ngô Đình Nhu. The program called for rural people to provide manpower and labor to build and defend the strategic hamlets. It was an ambitious program which projected that 7,000 strategic hamlets would be built by the end of 1962 and 12,000 by the end of 1963, thus consolidating nearly all the rural population of South Vietnam.

4 February

The first American helicopter is shot down.

8 February

Kennedy authorized the creation of "Military Assistance Command – Vietnam" (MACV) to support and assist South Vietnam in defeating the Viet Cong insurgency. MAAG continued to exist, but only to train Vietnam's armed forces. General Paul D. Harkins, recommended by President Kennedy's military adviser, General Maxwell Taylor, was named MACV commander. Harkins and his staff had little or no counterinsurgency experience. Moreover, the counterinsurgency effort lacked a "single directing authority" and a "continuing, authoritative interagency oversight." The MACV commander did not have control of the entire counterinsurgency effort and MACV "labored under complex command relationships and had to thread its way through intractable interservice conflicts over fine points of organization, staffing, and doctrine. MACV commander Harkins reported to CINCPAC Chief, Admiral Felt who kept MACV "on a tight rein."

11 February

An Operation Farm Gate SC-47 crashed 70 miles (110 km) north of Saigon while on a leaflet-dropping mission, killing eight Americans (six Air Force and two Army) and one Vietnamese.

14 February

Journalist James Reston published an article in The New York Times stating that "The United States is now involved in an undeclared war in South Vietnam. This is well known to the Russians, the Chinese Communists, and everybody else concerned except the American people...Has the President made clear to the Congress and the nation the extent of the U.S. commitment to the South Vietnam government and the dangers involved?"

18 February

North Vietnam contacted diplomats from the United Kingdom and the Soviet Union, co-chairs of the Geneva Accords of 1954, requesting that they "urgently study effective measures to end U.S. aggression in South Vietnam." Later, North Vietnam requested that the UK and USSR "proceed to consultations with the interested countries to seek effective means of preserving the Geneva settlement of 1954 and safeguarding peace."

20 February

Senator Wayne Morse said in a Senate Hearing closed to the public, "when those ships start coming back to the west coast with the flag-draped coffins of American boys, look out, because the American people, in my judgement are going to be very much divided....I have grave doubts as to the constitutionality of the President's course of action in South Vietnam."

VC threw four hand grenades into a crowded village theater near Cần Thơ, killing 24 women and children. In all, 108 persons were killed or injured.

21 February

The Department of State cabled instructions about dealing with the media to the U.S. Embassy in Saigon. The instructions said that it was not in U.S. interest "to have stories indicating that Americans are leading and directing combat missions against the Viet Cong."

A National Intelligence Estimate (NIE) by the Central Intelligence Agency (CIA) estimated VC numbers in South Vietnam. There were at least 25,000 full time fighters supported by 100,000 part time locals serving as village defense forces. The NIE estimated that 800 North Vietnamese PAVN officers and soldiers were in South Vietnam assisting the VC.

26 February

Newsweek magazine asked the question: "Will the sending of U.S. troops lead to escalation, more guerrillas, more Americans, and an eventual confrontation of the U.S. and Red China? Above all can the U.S. strategy win the war?"

27 February

Two Republic of Vietnam Air Force (RVNAF) pilots flying U.S. supplied A-1 Skyraiders bombed the Independence Palace in Saigon to protest President's Diệm's priority on remaining in office rather than defeating the VC. Diệm and his family were uninjured. One of the pilots was imprisoned; the other fled to Cambodia. Both returned to duty after Diệm's death.

== March ==
1 March

The U.S. Department of Defense (DOD) estimated that the VC numbered 20,000 full-time guerrillas, up from 4,000 two years earlier. DOD estimated that the VC controlled 10 percent of South Vietnam's hamlets and had influence in another 60 percent. In the cities, however, VC influence was minimal and the Montagnard people of the Central Highlands supported neither the government nor the communists. The bulk of the VC fighters were located in the Mekong Delta and near Saigon.

DOD identified three types of VC fighters. First the main forces were well armed and used only on large operations; second were the provincial and district units, a mixture of guerrillas and organized units; and third, not part of the 20,000 estimate, were the part-time guerrillas, often armed only with primitive weapons but important for intelligence, logistics, and terrorist operations. Five hundred to 1,000 men monthly were estimated to be infiltrating South Vietnam from North Vietnam.

6 March

The People's Republic of China called for an international conference to seek peace in South Vietnam. Cambodia and the Soviet Union supported the proposal. Negotiations in Geneva to create a neutralist coalition government in Laos seemed the inspiration for proposals by North Vietnam, its allies, and neutral Cambodia to seek the convening of a conference.

12 March

The New Republic magazine said, "The US has 'capitulated' to Diệm and has bound itself to the defense of a client regime without exacting on its part sacrifices necessary for success. American lives are to be risked in a holding action based on the inexplicable hope that with sharpened-up counter-guerrilla operations and marginal reforms the regime will last."

16 March

Flying Tiger Line Flight 739 disappeared approximately 300 miles (480 km) west of Guam. The Lockheed L-1049 Super Constellation with a crew of 11 was transporting 93 U.S. soldiers and three South Vietnamese from Travis Air Force Base, California to Tan Son Nhut Air Base.

19 March

Operation Sunrise was the first operation in the strategic hamlet program, carried out by ARVN with U.S. advice and transport assistance in the Bến Cát region of the Bình Dương province, 25 miles (40 km) north of Saigon. The plan was to kill or expel VC guerrillas and relocate the rural people to four strategic hamlets. However, unlike Thompson's plan which contemplated beginning the strategic hamlet program in relatively secure areas, Bình Dương was heavily under the influence of the VC, nearly all of whom had prior warning of the operation and escaped. The remaining inhabitants were rounded up and forcibly resettled in the strategic hamlets. To control the area, ARVN had to keep a large number of soldiers stationed in Bến Cát and the VC harassed both the army and the hamlets, bringing them under its control in 1964.

26 March

Begun in November 1961 in the village of Buon Enao with 400 inhabitants, the Civilian Irregular Defense Group (CIDG) project in Darlac province among the Montgnard peoples had expanded to cover 14,000 people with 972 village defenders and a 300-man strike force to combat VC guerrillas. The CIDG was supported by U.S. Army Special Forces and ARVN Special Forces and the CIA with Special Forces soldiers being assigned to villages to train the defenders. The project was managed by David A. Nuttle, an agriculture adviser from Kansas, ARVN Captain Nguyen Duc Phu and Montagnard leader Y-Ju, the village chief of Buon Enao.

29 March

The Joints Chiefs of Staff finalized instructions to MACV concerning "maximum discretion" and "minimum publicity" for U.S. air operations in South Vietnam. If an enemy aircraft was shot down, MACV was instructed to remain silent unless it became necessary to contradict communist propaganda in which case MACV was to say that while on a routine training flight, an unidentified airplane initiated hostile action and was shot down. If a U.S. airplane was lost, MACV was instructed to say that the aircraft was on a routine orientation flight and the cause of the accident is being investigated. MACV was further instructed to ensure that all knowledgeable personnel were "instructed and rehearsed" with these rules.

== April ==
8 April

The VC executed two wounded American prisoners of war near the village of An Châu. Each, hands tied, was shot in the face because he could not keep up with the retreating captors.

15 April

The first United States Marine Corps helicopter unit to serve in South Vietnam, HMM-362 with Sikorsky UH-34s codenamed "SHUFLY" arrived at Sóc Trăng Airfield.

== May ==
In May 1962, the Viet Cong began establishing battalion-sized units within the Central Highlands.

6 to 27 May

A PAVN assault routed Royal Lao Government (RLG) forces forcing 2000 troops to flee across the Mekong River into Thailand.

8 May

Operation Sea Swallow began in Phú Yên province in central South Vietnam. The objectives were similar to those of Operation Sunrise. The goal was to build more than 80 strategic hamlets in the province before the end of 1962. As of 18 May, more than 600 Civic Action personnel had been trained in the province. Although relatively positive about the strategic hamlet program, Roger Hilsman reported to the State Department that the program suffered from "inadequate direction, coordination, and internal assistance...In the short run, the success of the effort will depend largely on the degree of physical security provided the peasantry, but in the long run the key to success will be the ability of the government to walk the thin line of meaningful and sustained assistance to the villagers without obvious efforts to direct, regiment, or control them."

19 May – 1 July

U.S. Marines disembark in Bangkok

The Battalion Landing Team 3rd Battalion, 9th Marines began flying in to Udorn Royal Thai Air Force Base from Bangkok as part of a buildup of U.S. forces in Thailand in response to the worsening situation of the RLG in the Laotian Civil War. The Marines were then moved north to the town of Nong Khai where they conducted field training exercises with the Royal Thai Army and civic action with Thai civilians. On 1 July with the situation in Laos stabilizing the Marines were flown from Udorn to the Philippines.

21 May

Lieutenant Colonel John Paul Vann arrived in Mỹ Tho in the Mekong Delta 40 miles (64 km) south of Saigon as head of the U.S. advisory mission to the ARVN 7th Division. The southern half of the delta was under VC control and the northern half was contested.

26 May

General William B. Rosson who had recently visited Buon Enao and the CIDG program in the Central Highlands told General Maxwell Taylor, President Kennedy's military adviser, that the Special Forces soldiers assigned to CIDG were being used "improperly" and that they should be engaged in offensive operations. Rosson's opposition to Buon Enao was especially significant because he was the U.S. Army's Director of Special Operations which oversaw the Special Forces.

30 May

Eleanor Ardel Vietti, Archie E. Mitchell and Daniel A. Gerber, missionaries working at the Buôn Ma Thuột leper colony were abducted by the VC. None have been seen since then and Vietti is the only American woman unaccounted for from the war.

== June ==
2 June

The Canadian and Indian representatives on the International Control Commission accused North Vietnam of subversion and covert action against South Vietnam, the Polish representative rejected the accusations.

6 June

Kennedy spoke to the graduating class at West Point attempting to instill in them his emphasis on counterinsurgency: "This is another type of war, new in its intensity, ancient in its origin – war by guerrillas, subversives, insurgents, assassins, war by ambush instead of by combat; by infiltration, instead of aggression, seeking victory by eroding and exhausting the enemy instead of engaging him...It requires...a whole new kind of strategy, a wholly different kind of force, and therefore a new and wholly different kind of military training."

8 June

Senator Wayne Morse went public with his criticism of the war. "I have heard no evidence which convinces me that it would be militarily wise to get bogged down anywhere in Asia in a conventional war."

10 June

Senator Mike Mansfield became the first prominent Democrat to question U.S. policy in South Vietnam. Mansfield, an early supporter of Diệm and the most knowledgeable Senator on Vietnam, called for Diệm to put more emphasis on political and economic development – as had been emphasized to Diệm "for many years." He advocated a greater use of diplomacy by the United States and less emphasis on military aid.

12 June

The RLG, Pathet Lao and Forces Armées Neutralistes agreed a power-sharing arrangement, temporarily suspending the civil war.

The VC ambushed a civilian passenger bus near Le Tri, An Giang province, killing five men and women.

== July ==
North Vietnamese leader Ho Chi Minh visited China. He told the Chinese that the United States might attack North Vietnam. China was alarmed by his statement and offered to equip 230 battalions (more than 100,000 soldiers) of the PAVN.

16 July

Journalist Bernard Fall met with Prime Minister Phạm Văn Đồng and Ho Chi Minh in Hanoi. Đồng said "we do not want to give pretexts that could lead to an American military intervention in the South." Fall expressed the view that the North Vietnamese would accept a neutralist government in South Vietnam to end U.S. military involvement in South Vietnam, provided that the government did not include Diệm. That same month, North Vietnamese official Lê Duẩn instructed the VC leadership to avoid escalating the war by attacking cities as that might cause the United States to intervene in the war.

19 July

The National Liberation Front proposed to end the war in South Vietnam with a ceasefire, the withdrawal of American soldiers and the creation of a coalition government of all factions pending elections. South Vietnam would become a neutral country, as were Cambodia and Laos, guaranteed by international treaty.

23 July

The CIA had requested an increase in Special Forces soldiers to 400 to expand the CIDG program among the Montagnards in the Central Highlands. Instead, McNamara and Harkins transferred responsibility for CIDG from CIA to the DOD which wanted the Special Forces "used in conjunction with active and offensive operations, as opposed to support of static training activities." The transfer of responsibility was called Operation Switchback. A factor possibly influencing the takeover by DOD of the CIDG program was the concern of Diệm. He was afraid that the Montagnards in Darlac, having gained weapons, training and organization under CIDG, might demand autonomy within South Vietnam. Diệm demanded that the Montagnards be disarmed and be under the control of provincial authorities appointed by him.

Harkins told a meeting of McNamara and U.S. military leaders in Hawaii that "there is no doubt we are on the winning side." He predicted that it would take about one year for MACV to develop the South Vietnamese military forces to the point where they could fully engage the VC. McNamara was more cautious stating that he thought it would take three years to get the VC insurgency under control.

The International Agreement on the Neutrality of Laos was signed in Geneva by 14 countries, including China, the Soviet Union, and the United States. The agreement declared a cease fire between the Royal Lao government and the Pathet Lao guerrillas and aimed to maintain Laos as a neutral country with a coalition government. What resulted instead was a resumption of the Laotian Civil War and a de facto partition of the country with the government controlling the western half of the country and the Pathet Lao the eastern half. The Ho Chi Minh Trail was in territory controlled by the Pathet Lao.

31 July

The Australian Army Training Team Vietnam arrived in South Vietnam beginning Australia's military commitment there.

== August ==
3 August

An Australian analysis of North Vietnam's proposal for the neutralization of South Vietnam concluded that Diệm was "unlikely...to agree to internal negotiations for the withdrawal of United States military aid and the neutralization of South Vietnam." Thus, Hanoi was exploiting international opinion by appearing to be open to negotiations. The failure of the Geneva Agreement on Laos and the outbreak of hostilities between the Royal Lao Government, supported by the U.S., and the Pathet Lao, supported by North Vietnam, in the summer of 1962 destroyed whatever faith North Vietnam had in negotiations with the United States and South Vietnam and strengthened the militants, notably Lê Duẩn, in their conviction that Vietnam would only be united by military action.

20 August

Cambodia's Prince Norodom Sihanouk asks Kennedy to convene an international conference to guarantee Cambodian neutrality, otherwise he threatens to request Chinese protection.

== September ==
11 September

In a briefing for Kennedy's military adviser, General Taylor in Saigon, Colonel Vann attempted to present his views that the war was going badly, but Harkins overrode or refuted him. Vann believed that the ARVN was too passive and that indiscriminate bombing, by both South Vietnamese and American pilots, of villages and hamlets was counterproductive, aiding the VC in gaining recruits. He also believed that too many American arms provided to the ARVN and security forces were ending up in the hands of the VC, thus contributing to their growth in numbers.

20 September

After his visit to South Vietnam, Taylor returned to Washington. His report was optimistic, citing progress in implementing the strategic hamlet program and training ARVN, improved performances by the paramilitary Civil Guard and Self-Defense Forces, and a larger area of territory under the control of South Vietnam. He also cited problems with intelligence, South Vietnam's lack of a counterinsurgency plan, and continued infiltration of men and supplies from North Vietnam.

== October ==
A Montagnard tribesman during training in 1962.

The Buon Enao CIDG project in Darlac province now counted about 200 Montagnard villages with a population of 60,000 people joined to resist the VC. They were protected by 10,600 defenders and 1,500 strike force personnel. Both the defenders and strike force personnel were themselves villagers. The U.S. Special Forces had four soldiers in each of six Area Development Centers responsible for both civic and paramilitary action. Firefights between the VC and the villages were nearly daily occurrences. About 50 villagers were killed by the VC during 1962; VC casualties were estimated at 200 killed and 460 captured. Buon Enao was considered by some senior U.S. military officers as the most impressive American accomplishment achieved until then in South Vietnam. However, the transfer of responsibility for the CIDG from the CIA to the DOD under Operation Switchover would soon destroy the effectiveness of the program as U.S. Special Forces were increasingly assigned purely military missions.

1 October

Taylor was named by Kennedy to be Chairman of the Joint Chiefs of Staff.

8 October

Two UH-34Ds of HMM-361 were shot down by VC while on a search-and-rescue mission 38 miles (61 km) southwest of Da Nang killing four pilots, five Marine crewmen, the squadron's flight surgeon and two Navy corpsmen in the largest one-day U.S. loss of life to that point in the war.

9 October

After being deluged with more than 200 visitors from the DOD in the previous month, all requiring food, housing, entertainment, and visits to the countryside to see the war, Taylor issued a directive to "reduce the number of visitors...to those having actual business of pressing interest." The directive only temporarily reduced the number of visitors.

The Utility Tactical Transport Helicopter Company equipped with 15 armed UH-1A helicopters arrived in South Vietnam. They would make their combat debut escorting troop carrying helicopters ten days later.

11 October

The first sea shipment of weapons from North Vietnam to the VC was unloaded in Cà Mau province.

20 October

Journalist David Halberstam wrote in The New York Times that "the closer one gets to the actual contact level of the war, the further one gets from official optimism."

A VC threw a grenade into a holiday crowd in downtown Saigon, killing six persons, including two children and injuring 38 people.

== November ==
4 November

A VC threw a grenade into an alley in Cần Thơ, killing one American serviceman and two Vietnamese children. A third Vietnamese child was seriously injured.

14 November

A Situation Report prepared at The Pentagon expressed satisfaction at progress being made in South Vietnam. The ARVN was becoming more effective; VC activity was diminishing. The ARVN now numbered 219,000, the Civil Guard 77,000 and the Self Defense Corps 99,500. In South Vietnam, the U.S. had 11,000 advisers, 300 aircraft, 120 helicopters, heavy weapons, pilots flying combat missions, defoliants and napalm.

30 November

Senator Mansfield arrived in Saigon as head of a congressional fact-finding delegation. Nolting and Harkins gave the delegation optimistic briefings on the military situation in South Vietnam. "We can see the light at the end of the tunnel", said Nolting. Mansfield had been an early supporter of Diệm, but found him on this occasion "gradually being cut off from reality." He met with an "aggressive" Madame Nhu and her husband Ngô Đình Nhu who touted the Strategic Hamlet Program. Mansfield's meeting with journalists, however, revealed a different and much more pessimistic view of Vietnam. Embassy Deputy Chief of Mission William Trueheart hinted to Mansfield that the journalists' view was correct.

== December ==
10 December

The Politburo of North Vietnam assessed the progress of the insurgency in South Vietnam, in a meeting from 6 to 10 December. Although the VC had achieved many successes, they were still not able to counter American and ARVN mobility. The VC were tasked with studying how they could overcome that mobility. Political and military struggle was still rudimentary in South Vietnam and liberated areas were small. A priority for the VC was to destroy the Strategic Hamlet Program with an expanded insurgency. Military Transportation Group 559 was instructed to build a road through Laos to facilitate the transportation of greater quantities of arms and supplies from North Vietnam to the VC.

26 December

Mansfield gave Kennedy a copy of his lengthy report on South Vietnam and briefed the President. Mansfield concluded that little progress had been made by Diệm, politically or militarily, since the Geneva Accords of 1954. Diệm had also made little progress in gaining popular support in the countryside, which by night was ruled largely by the VC. It "wasn't a pretty picture" that Mansfield presented to Kennedy, who disagreed with some of Mansfield's opinions.

27 December

The reports of several American military officers who had visited South Vietnam were mostly pessimistic. They said that Diệm's control of the ARVN extended to refusing to arm certain units because he feared they would attempt a coup d'état against him. Regarding the performance of ARVN, one officer said it was "proficient at attacking an open rice field with nothing in it and...quickly bypassing any heavily wooded area that might possible contain a few VC." The reports were given to Marine Corps general Victor Krulak, who was preparing to visit South Vietnam as part of a high-level U.S. military mission to assess progress in the war.

31 December

North Vietnam infiltrated 12,850 persons into South Vietnam, mostly southern communists who had migrated to North Vietnam in 1954–1955. Fifty-three American soldiers were killed in South Vietnam during the year. The South Vietnamese armed forces suffered 4,457 killed in action, 10 percent more than the total killed in the previous year.
