= Charles J. Timmes =

United States Army general (1907–1990)

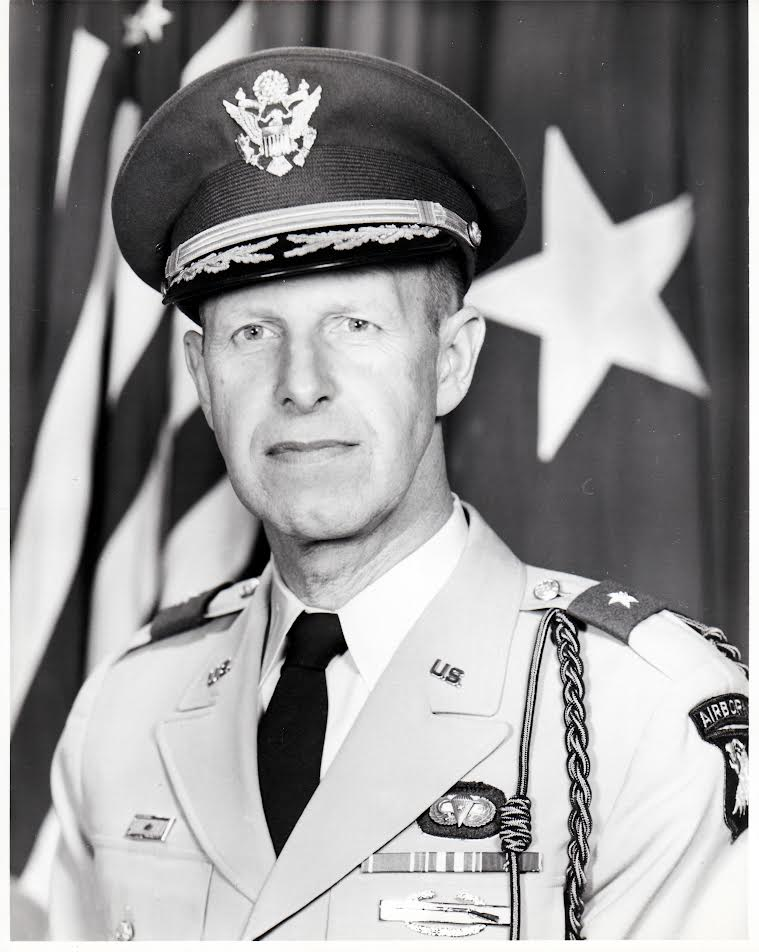
- Born: July 18, 1907; Innsbruck, Austro-Hungary
- Died: October 20, 1990 (aged 83); Falls Church, Virginia, U.S.
- Burial place: Arlington National Cemetery
- Military career
- Allegiance: United States of America
- Branch: United States Army
- Service years: 1929–1967
- Rank: Major General
- Commands: Military Assistance Command, Vietnam
- Conflicts: World War II; Vietnam War
- Awards: Silver Star; Distinguished Service Medal (2); Purple Heart (2); Distinguished Service Cross

Charles John Timmes (July 18, 1907 – October 20, 1990) was a United States Army Major General and chief of the Military Assistance Advisory Group in the early 1960s.

== Early life and education ==
Timmes was born in Innsbruck, Austro-Hungarian Empire where his father, an American medical doctor was pursuing advanced studies. His family returned to the United States, living in New York City. Timmes attended Fordham University, graduating with a law degree in 1932 and practiced as a lawyer in New York for the next seven years.

== Career ==
Timmes was called to active duty in 1939.

=== World War II ===
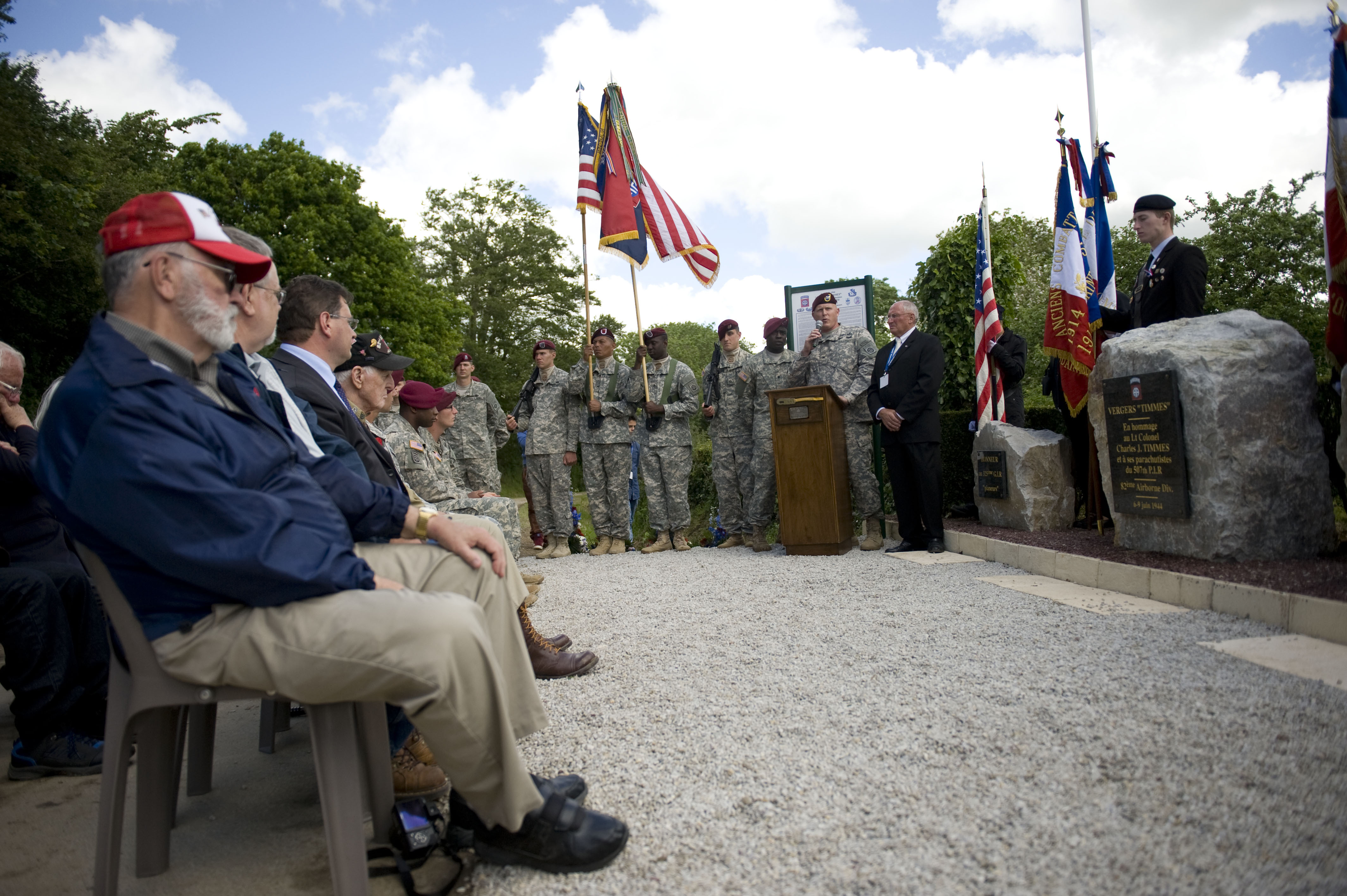
Ceremony at Timmes' Orchard, June 2014

Lt. Col. Timmes was commander of the 2nd Battalion, 507th Parachute Infantry Regiment which was dropped on Mission Boston, part of the American airborne landings in Normandy on the morning of 6 June 1944. The 2/507th was tasked with securing the western end of the La Fière bridge approximately 3 km from Sainte-Mère-Église, however his battalion had been widely scattered during the drop landing in grassing swampland along the Merderet river, by the end of the day Timmes controlled a group of approximately 100 men in defensive positions in an orchard. On 8 June German forces launched 4 separate attacks on Timmes' position, all of which were repulsed. A request for support was sent to the 82nd Airborne Division headquarters and a battalion from the 325th Glider Infantry Regiment was sent as reinforcements. Timmes then launched attacks on the German positions and the La Fière causeway. On 9 June the 325th attacked German positions at Cauquigny but were beaten back and withdrew to the orchard which came under renewed attack by the Germans before they were relieved later that day. The site of the battle is now known as Timmes Orchard and monuments to the 507th, the 325th and the 508th have been erected nearby.

The 507th Parachute Infantry Regiment was transferred to the 17th Airborne Division on its return to England in July 1944. Timmes again led the 2/507th in Operation Varsity in March 1945.

=== Post World War II ===
After the war Timmes studied the Russian language at the Army's Defense Language Institute at the Presidio of Monterey, California and Russian history at Columbia University. These studies prevented him from taking part in the Korean War. Timmes received a master's degree in political theory from Georgetown University and graduated from the Command and General Staff College, Armed Forces Staff College, and the National War College. Timmes then served in South Korea from November 1956 until March 1958 and as an intelligence officer in Washington D.C. Timmes was assistant commander of the 101st Airborne Division from March 1959 to May 1961.

=== Vietnam War ===
In July 1961, Timmes was sent to South Vietnam, where he served as deputy to Military Assistance Advisory Group (MAAG) chief Lt. Gen. Lionel C. McGarr. When McGarr left this post in March 1962, Timmes succeeded him and remained in this post until 15 May 1964 when MAAG was subsumed into Military Assistance Command, Vietnam. Timmes remained in South Vietnam until July 1964. During this period Timmes built relations with many of the Army of the Republic of Vietnam (ARVN) officers who would play important roles during the war including General Dương Văn Minh. On 15 November 1963 Timmes announced that 1000 U.S. advisers would be withdrawn in December, bringing the number of advisers down to 15,500.

After retiring from the Army Timmes joined the Central Intelligence Agency (CIA) and returned to South Vietnam in 1967 where his role was liaison with the South Vietnamese leadership and ARVN commanders, many of whom he knew when they were junior officers during his earlier tour in Vietnam. Timmes renewed his friendship with Dương Văn Minh and they often played tennis together at the Cercle Sportif.

Timmes acted as a go-between for the US Embassy and the South Vietnamese Government during the Fall of Saigon and was instrumental in facilitating the resignation of President Nguyễn Văn Thiệu on 21 April and the ascent of Dương Văn Minh to the presidency on 27 April in the hope that he would be able to negotiate a ceasefire with the North Vietnamese. On 25 April 1975 CIA station chief Thomas Polgar, Timmes and fellow CIA agent Frank Snepp escorted former President Thiệu to Tan Son Nhat International Airport where Thiệu boarded a plane that would take him into exile. On 29 April, Timmes was evacuated from the U.S. Embassy during Operation Frequent Wind on the same helicopter as Frank Snepp.

== Later life ==
After retiring from the CIA in 1975, Timmes worked for the Washington law firm Altmann & Vitt.

Timmes died on 20 October 1990 in Falls Church, Virginia and was buried at Arlington National Cemetery.

== External sources ==
- https://valor.militarytimes.com/hero/23134#12676
