= Operation Sunrise (Vietnam War) =

South Vietnamese counteroffensive (1962)

- Part of the Vietnam War
Date	22 March – 30 April 1962
Location	Bến Cát District, Bình Dương Province
Result	South Vietnam tactical victory

Belligerents
South Vietnam; United States	(Provisional Revolutionary Government of the Republic of South Vietnam) Viet Cong

Commanders and leaders
(South Vietnam) Ngo Dinh Diem	?

Operation Sunrise was the first phase of a long-range South Vietnamese counter-offensive against the Việt Cộng (VC) during the Vietnam War. Launched with the United States in March 1962, the goal of the operation was to "clear the VC from an area 40 miles northwest of Saigon" according to contemporary U.S. government documents. Beginning in the Bến Cát District of the Bình Dương Province 35 miles (56 km) from Saigon, it grew to include the provinces of Tây Ninh and Phước Tuy. The concept of "strategic hamlets" was formulated as a part of Operation Sunrise, with the operation acting as a 'test area' for the Strategic Hamlet Program which developed from the operation. As part of the broader Hearts and Minds campaign the operation failed to have the desired impact. Despite the success in lowering the numbers of VC in the area, the local citizens were opposed to being removed from their ancestral lands. With 70 families voluntarily relocating and 140 more being moved by intimidation the willingness of families to move is under doubt. The US Agency for International Development provided $300,000 in compensation to the relocated families. U.S. soldiers' views on the hamlets were at times sympathetic, with General Thomas Bowen's collection of songs from U.S. soldiers of the time showing an empathy with the peasantry kept in hamlets.

The Strategic Hamlet Program's early fortified hamlets were not well defended, and over 50 of the hamlets were overrun by VC who killed or intimidated village leaders. South Vietnamese President Ngo Dinh Diem proceeded to sanction bombing raids on suspected VC-controlled hamlets. The air strikes were chiefly conducted by the Republic of Vietnam Air Force with some support from U.S. pilots. South Vietnamese light tanks then pushed into the hamlets to suppress any rebels left over. Although dozens of VC were killed, popularity fell as a result of the number of civilian casualties. This deteriorated popular support for Diem and led to growing peasant anger towards the U.S., whose Strategic Hamlet Program and complicity in the bombing campaign had damaged peasant life.
