= Battle of Gò Công =

Part of the Vietnam War (1963)

- Part of the Vietnam War
Date	3 September 1963
Location	Gò Công, Định Tường Province, South Vietnam
Result	South Vietnamese victory

Belligerents
South Vietnam	Viet Cong

Commanders and leaders
(South Vietnam) Ngô Đình Diệm	Nguyễn Văn Linh

Strength
(South Vietnam) Gò Công Provincial Forces, IV Corps, ~2,000	200

Casualties and losses
Unknown	Unknown killed or wounded 91 personnels captured

The Battle of Gò Công was a small battle during the Vietnam War. It took place on 3 September 1963 near Gò Công, Định Tường Province, after the General Staff of the Viet Cong (VC) (controlled by North Vietnam) called for "another Ấp Bắc" on South Vietnamese forces. The intent of the operation was to drive out the VC who had survived the earlier Ấp Bắc engagement. The battle was won by South Vietnamese forces, after inflicting heavy casualties on the VC, using artillery to slaughter VC fighters. It was later discovered that the 91 of the captured VC troops were new recruits, and did not have weapons.
