= Battle of Hiep Hoa =

1963 battle of the Vietnam war

Battle of Hiệp Hòa
- Part of the Vietnam War
| Date | November 22, 1963 |
| Location | Hiệp Hòa, Long An Province, South Vietnam 10.914°N 106.316°E |
| Result | Viet Cong/North Vietnamese victory |

Belligerents
| Viet Cong; North Vietnam | United States; South Vietnam |

Strength
| 500+ | 219 |

Casualties and losses
| Unknown, 7 bodies left behind | 41 killed 32 missing 2 captured |

The Battle of Hiệp Hòa was a minor battle of the Vietnam War. On the night of November 22, 1963, an estimated 500 Viet Cong (VC) fighters overran the Hiệp Hòa Special Forces Camp, resulting in four American personnel missing. South Vietnamese commando units and the American Special Forces resisted heavily using machine guns but were overwhelmed by the arrival of a People's Army of Vietnam mortar unit. It was the first CIDG camp to be overrun during the war. Isaac Camacho, one of the four missing Americans, later became the first American to escape from a VC POW camp.

The fall of the camp marked one of the first times a CIDG base of this sort was overrun, representing a blow to the U.S./South Vietnamese special-forces construction of remote outposts. Some sources mark this as the first such camp to fall.

In South Vietnamese historiography, the battle is celebrated in Long An province as a “victory” that boosted local morale, showed weaknesses in the “strategic hamlet” approach, and helped to shift the dynamic in that sector of operations.

On a broader U.S./allied level, the incident highlighted vulnerabilities in remote Special Forces / CIDG camp construction: poor security, infiltration risks, and difficulties defending isolated posts.
