= Civilian Irregular Defense Group program =

Civilian Irregular Defense Group
- Lực lượng Dân sự chiến đấu
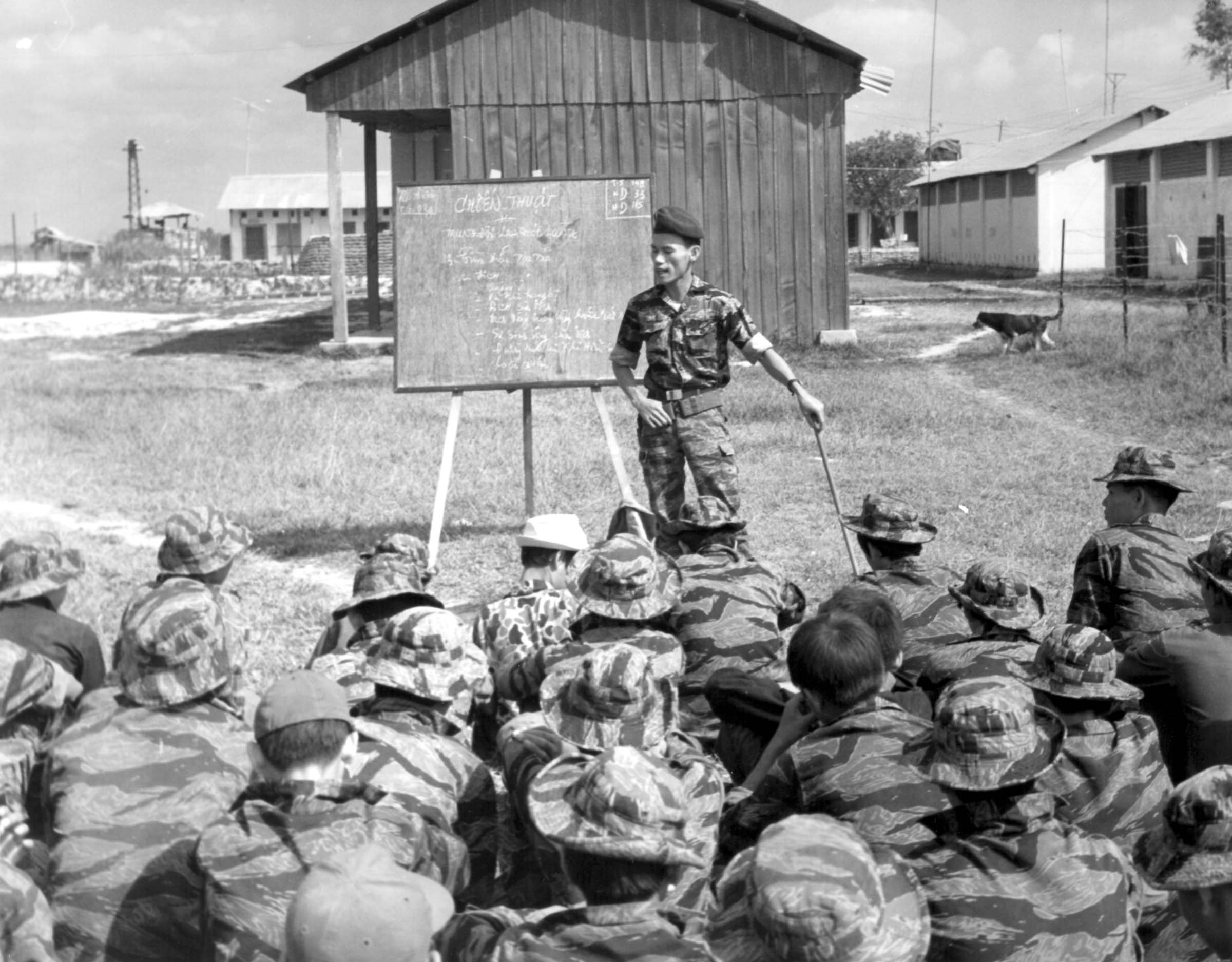
- CIDG unit training
- Active: 1961–1970
- Country: South Vietnam
- Allegiance: Central Intelligence Agency; U.S. Military Assistance Command, Vietnam
- Branch: Army of the Republic of Vietnam
- Type: Militia
- Role: Anti-guerrilla warfare Artillery observer Bomb disposal Border security Close-quarters battle Counterinsurgency; Force protection HUMINT; Irregular warfare Jungle warfare Mountain warfare Raiding; Reconnaissance; Tracking
- Part of: Army of the Republic of Vietnam Special Forces; Vietnamese Rangers (as Border Ranger camps)

The Civilian Irregular Defense Group (CIDG, pronounced /ˈsɪdʒiː/, SID-jee; Vietnamese: Lực lượng Dân sự chiến đấu) was a military program developed by the Central Intelligence Agency (CIA) during the Vietnam War, which was intended to develop South Vietnamese irregular military units (militia) from indigenous ethnic-minority populations. The main purpose of setting up the CIDG program was to counter the growing influence of Viet Cong (VC) in the Central Highlands by training and arming the villagers for village defense. The program rapidly expanded after the United States Armed Forces transferred its control from CIA to the Military Assistance Command, Vietnam (MACV) after two years since its inception, and changed its focus from village defense to more conventional operations. From June 1967 onwards, the CIDG members were made part of the Army of the Republic of Vietnam Special Forces or other South Vietnamese government agencies to increase Vietnamese participation. By late 1970, the remaining CIDG camps were converted to Vietnamese Rangers (ARVN Rangers) camps. The indigenous ethnic-minority people that formed the CIDG reaped significant benefits from the government of South Vietnam for their allegiance, and it was the first time that minority groups were given full status as citizens of South Vietnam.

== Purpose ==
The CIDG program was formed for two reasons:

1. U.S. mission Saigon believed that the South Vietnamese effort to create similar paramilitary units needed to be bolstered.
2. The U.S. feared that the VC would be able to recruit large numbers of minority troops.

== History ==
The CIDG program was devised by the CIA in early 1961 to counter expanding VC influence in the Central Highlands. Beginning in the village of Buon Enao, small A Teams from the Green Berets moved into villages and set up Area Development Centers. Focusing on local defense and civic action, the Green Berets teams did the majority of the training. Villagers were trained and armed for village defense for two weeks, while localized strike forces (MIKE Force) would receive better training and weapons and served as a quick reaction force to react to VC attacks. The vast majority of the CIDG camps were initially manned by inhabitants of ethnic minority regions in the country (especially Montagnard), who disliked both the North and South Vietnamese and therefore quickly took to the American advisers. The program was widely successful, as once one village was pacified, it served as a training camp for other local villages.

By 1963, the US military felt that the program was a great success, but only that the CIDG units and Green Berets units were not being employed properly, and ordered Operation Switchback, which transferred control of the CIDG program from the CIA over to Military Assistance Command, Vietnam (MACV). The CIDG Program was rapidly expanded, as the entire 5th Special Forces Group (Airborne) (5th SFG (A)), United States Army Special Forces (USASF), moved into Vietnam, and the CIDG units stopped focusing on village defense and instead took part in more conventional operations, most notably Border surveillance.

In 1966, Army Chief of Staff General Harold K. Johnson was confused and unhappy with the activities of the Green Berets in South Vietnam. They were "supposed to be training guerrilla warfare," he observed, "and what they did was build fortifications out of the Middle Ages and bury themselves... with concrete." After visiting some of their more exposed Highland camps, he expressed "horror" that an organization that prided itself on being a "highly mobile, disdainful of fixed installations, innovative, [and] not requiring organized logistical support" should find itself "in fortified installations with mortars in concrete emplacements with fixed range cards printed on the concrete, and literally... locked in by their own actions." In his estimation, the CIDG program drained manpower from Saigon and was too expensive; the indigenous soldiers spent too much time protecting their own dependents who lived nearby. Furthermore, he felt that Green Berets members "viewed themselves as something separate and distinct from the rest of the military effort," describing them as "fugitives from responsibility" who "tended to be nonconformist, couldn't quite get along in a straight military system, and found a haven where their actions were not scrutinized too carefully, and where they came under only sporadic or intermittent observation from the regular chain of command."

Many CIDG camps were assaulted or attacked. An example of this is the assault on Camp Lộc Ninh, A-311, situated in the III Corps area, which took place from 29 October to 4 November 1967. The camp strike force, together with elements of the 1st Infantry Division (1ID), which reinforced it on the second day, successfully defended the camp with no other help, except for air strikes. It is estimated that 1,000 enemies were killed, of which 184 were credited to the civilian irregulars and their American allies. Six CIDG troops died, and 39 were wounded; four members of the Green Berets died.

Three major changes took place in the CIDG effort between June 1967 and June 1968:

1. In the context of Vietnamization, the 5th SFG (A) began to prepare for disengagement and prepared CIDG members to become part of the ARVN or other government agencies. This involved closure, conversion and/or turnover of the CIDG camps to full Army of the Republic of Vietnam Special Forces (ARVN Special Forces) control.
2. Great emphasis was given to assistance of the CIDG soldier and his family; with the intention of increasing Vietnamese participation, thereby preparing the South Vietnamese for a total take-over and improving their motivation to keep fighting.
3. The third change was a result of the Tet Offensive, launched in January 1968, in which CIDG troops successfully defended a number of urban centers, such as Nha Trang, Qui Nhon, Kon Tum, Pleiku, Chau Doc, Ban Me Thuot, Phan Thiet and Dalat. This was considered an excellent performance considering their training mainly involved anti-guerrilla forces, combat patrols in highland areas, counterinsurgency, and jungle warfare with small unit tactics. Since then, CIDG forces were regarded as an economy of force element, which could be used to release conventional units for deployment in response to new enemy buildups. They also were used for conventional operations, along with the U.S. and other Free World forces.

In response to the increasing enemy firepower, also in recognition to the CIDG, the US MACV approved a weapons modernization program in April 1968, under which CIDG troops were equipped with M16 rifles, M60 machine guns, and M79 grenade launchers. Up to that point, CIDG troops had used mainly M1 Carbines and M14 rifles. The weapons transfer program was completed in January 1969.

By 1 June 1970, the number of CIDG camps in South Vietnam had been reduced to thirty-eight, either by conversion to South Vietnamese Regional Forces (SVRF) status or by closure. The South Vietnamese Joint General Staff (JGS) and the MACV staff then decided to convert the remaining camps to ARVN Rangers camps, with a target date of 31 December 1970. Progressive, concurrent conversion cycles were initiated, with the major criteria being the state of security around each camp and seasonal weather. Camps in relatively secure areas that could be supplied easily during the rainy season were converted first. Camps in less secure areas were scheduled for later conversion so that more time and resources could be applied to increase the combat readiness of these camps. The final number of CIDG camps converted to Rangers was 37.

During the stand-down period, every effort was made to raise the combat readiness of the 37 remaining CIDG camps to the highest efficiency. Concurrently, a concerted effort was made to assimilate the Montagnard and other minority ethnic groups from remote areas into the ARVN. The ARVN Special Forces and the 5th SFG (A) staff developed jointly a program designed to continue operational missions in CIDG camps; process CIDG members administratively and medically; prepare MACV advisers for camp missions; transfer logistical support; reorganize CIDG units into Ranger battalions; and assimilate CIDG leaders into the ARVN ranks. The conversion process proceeded successfully, partly because the ARVN Special Forces camp commanders stayed in place and automatically became Ranger battalion commanders. Their familiarity with the troops, the camp area, and the tactical area of operations was invaluable. The MACV advisers did not arrive for duty until some 17 camps had been converted. The fact that many of the advisers were former Green Berets men familiar with the camps minimized problems. As a result of the close co-ordination between U.S. and ARVN Special Forces, the Ranger Command was strengthened by the addition of 37 light infantry battalions. Of the possible 17,057 troop spaces scheduled for conversion 14,534 CIDG troops actually became members of the Ranger command. A significant benefit that accrued to the minority ethnic groups involved was the better treatment by the government of South Vietnam. For their allegiance, as expressed by their willingness to join the ARVN units, the government provided legal birth and marriage certificates as well as medical benefits and disability pay for injuries received in military action. This was the first time that the minority groups, and particularly the Montagnards, were given full status as citizens of South Vietnam.

== See also ==
- Battle of A Shau
- Battle of Dong Xoai
- Battle of Hiep Hoa
- Battle of Kham Duc
- Battle of Nam Dong
- Siege of Plei Me
