= Strategic Hamlet Program =

Rural Vietnamese anti-communist strategy

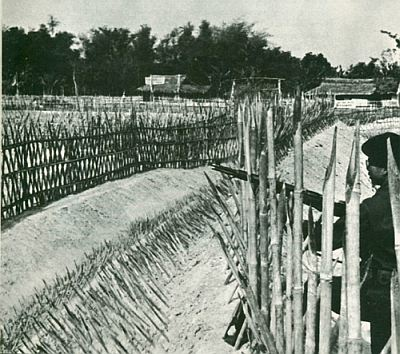
A strategic hamlet in South Vietnam, c. 1964

The Strategic Hamlet Program (SHP; Vietnamese: Ấp Chiến lược) was implemented in 1962 by the government of South Vietnam, with advice and financing from the United States, during the Vietnam War to combat the communist insurgency. The strategy was to isolate the rural population from contact with and influence by the National Liberation Front (NLF), more commonly known as the Viet Cong. The Strategic Hamlet Program, along with its predecessor, the Rural Community Development Program, attempted to create new communities of "protected hamlets". The rural peasants would be provided protection, economic support, and aid by the government, thereby strengthening ties with the South Vietnamese government (GVN) which was hoped would lead to increased loyalty by the peasantry towards the government. Most hamlets involved restructuring existing villages with a defensible perimeter. This led to the relocation of villagers living on the outskirts. In other instances, entire villages were relocated to new locations.

Colonel Phạm Ngọc Thảo, a communist sleeper agent of North Vietnam who had infiltrated the South Vietnamese army, was made overseer of the Strategic Hamlet Program. He sabotaged the program and had many hamlets built in areas with a strong NLF presence and forced the program forward at an unsustainable speed, causing the production of poorly equipped and poorly defended villages and the growth of rural resentment towards the government.

The Strategic Hamlet Program was unsuccessful, failing to stop the insurgency or gain support for the government from rural Vietnamese, it alienated many and helped contribute to the growth in influence of the NLF. After President Ngo Dinh Diem was overthrown in a coup in November 1963, the program was cancelled. Many hamlets were abandoned, destroyed or had been taken over by the NLF, with villagers moving back into their old homes or escaping the war by moving to the cities. The failure of the Strategic Hamlet and other counterinsurgency and pacification programs were causes that led the United States to decide to intervene in South Vietnam with air power and ground troops.

== Background and precursor program ==
In 1952, during the First Indochina War (19 December 1946 – 1 August 1954) French commander François de Linares, in Tonkin began the construction of "protected villages," which the French later named agrovilles. By constructing quasi-urban amenities, the French designed the agrovilles to attract peasants away from their villages. This policy was known as "pacification by prosperity." In addition to offering social and economic benefits, the French also encouraged villagers to develop their own militias, which the French trained and armed. "Pacification by Prosperity" had some success, but it was never decisive, because the settlers felt insecure, a feeling which the numerous French guard posts along the perimeter could do little to dispel so long as the Việt Minh operated at night, anonymously, and intimidated or gained the support of village authorities.

Between 1952 and 1954, French officials transplanted approximately 3 million Vietnamese into agrovilles, but the project was costly. To help offset the cost, the French relied partially on American financial support, which was "one of the earliest objects of American aid to France after the outbreak of the Korean War." According to a private Vietnamese source, the U.S. spent about "200,000 dollars on the 'show' agroville at Dong Quan." After visiting the villages of Khoi Loc in Quảng Yên Province and Đông Quan in Ha Dong Province, noted Vietnam War correspondent Bernard Fall stated that, "the French strategic hamlets resembled British [Malayan] prototypes line for line." However, in contrast to the British, the French were reluctant to grant Vietnam its independence, or allow the Vietnamese a voice in government affairs; therefore, the agroville program had little effect.

The First Indochina War terminated and the 1954 Geneva Conference partitioned Vietnam into communist (north) and non-communist (south) parts and the terms North Vietnam and South Vietnam became the common usage.

Beginning in 1954, Việt Minh sympathizers in the South were subject to escalating suppression by the Diem government, but by December 1960 the National Liberation Front of Southern Vietnam had been formed and soon rapidly achieved de facto control over large sections of the South Vietnamese countryside. At the time, it is believed that there were approximately 10,000 Communist insurgents throughout South Vietnam.

In February 1959, recognizing the danger that the guerrillas posed if they had the support of the peasants, President Diem and his brother, Ngô Đình Nhu, made a first attempt at resettlement. A plan was put forth to develop centers of agglomeration. Through force and/or incentives, peasants in rural communities were separated and relocated. The primary goal of the centers was to concentrate the villagers, so they were not able to provide aid, comfort, and information to the Viet Cong.

The Government of Vietnam (GVN) developed two types of centers of agglomeration.

The first type, qui khu, relocated Viet Cong (VC) families, people with relatives in North Vietnam, or people who had been associated with the Viet Minh into new villages; thus, providing easier government surveillance.

The second type of relocation center, qui ap, relocated into new villages those families that supported the South Vietnamese government but lived outside the realm of government protection and were susceptible to Viet Cong attacks. By 1960, there were twenty-three of these centers, each consisting of many thousands of people.

This mass resettlement created a strong backlash from peasants and forced the central government to rethink its strategy. A report put out by the Caravelle group, consisting of eighteen signers, leaders of the Cao Đài and Hòa Hảo sects, the Dai Viet, and dissenting Catholic groups described the situation as follows:

Tens of thousands of people are being mobilized… to take up a life in collectivity, to construct beautiful but useless agrovilles which tire the people, lose their affection, increase their resentment and most of all give an additional terrain for propaganda to the enemy.

== Ideological origins ==
Truman's Point Four Program in 1949 aimed to integrate 'third world' countries—i.e., those not aligned with NATO nor the Soviets—into the capitalist liberal economy to win 'hearts and minds.' The U.S. believed that by developing the 'third world' through education, sanitation, and reforming their economic and political systems, it could bring countries ‘out of the phase where rural revolutionary forces could come to power’ and create a path towards democracy. This was a similar to the stance that the U.S. took towards colonising the Philippines.

After the failure of the Truman and Eisenhower administration, Kennedy enacted a ‘flexible response’ program, which would increase the spectrum of military responses available to the U.S. to fight counterinsurgency. This response aimed to pre-empt the conditions which lead to guerrilla warfare and ultimately local support for communist nationalism: poverty, disease and hunger. The Strategic Hamlet Program was one such example of Kennedy's 'flexible response' initiative. The strategy was guided by an integrated model of social, economic and political change, in which the intensification of the war would lead to a transformation in Vietnamese society. It was hoped that an awareness of the material benefits of capitalism would catalyse the development of a new set of modern values and loyalties.

The Strategic Hamlet Program was also closely tied to modernisation theory promoted by W.W. Rostow, underpinning US Foreign Policy during the Kennedy and Johnson administrations. "Kennedy, his advisers, and the American foreign aid mission began to shift away from conventional military tactics and toward a comprehensive counterinsurgency program that integrated military action with a strategy of social engineering. By the end of 1961, the administration would become committed to defeating the Vietcong through modernisation". The Program was designed to strike at the heart of the Revolution's political and social roots. US policymakers believed that, if Diem's regime became the focus of popular aspirations, “nation-building and political development might stem the tide.” W.W. Rostow believed that responses to Communist warfare would have to harness the modernisation process that the insurgents sought to exploit. Thus, efforts at containment “needed to accelerate social progress” – it was anticipated that, if momentum could take hold in undeveloped areas, and social problems could be solved, the chances of insurgents seizing power would dramatically decline. Hence the promotion of modernization was regarded as means by which to “shut the narrow window of opportunity on which aggressors depended”.

In utilising the practice of modernisation, the US expressed a confidence on a global scale that it should be a “universal model for the world”. This approach "contributed directly to justifying the militaristic approach to third world politics, above all in Vietnam”.

The concept of modernisation relied on the belief that all societies, including Vietnam, passed along a linear trajectory from 'traditional' and economically unsophisticated, to 'modern' and able to harness nature through industrialisation, technology, and literacy rates.

The practice of village relocation within the Strategic Hamlet Program, holds foundations in Rostow's modernisation theory which recommended “destroying the external supports to guerrilla insurgents”. Relocation aimed to reduce the connections between the Vietcong and the Southern Vietnamese population, aiming to deter communist influence. “Modernizers aimed to replicate – by force if necessary – the stable, democratic, capitalist welfare state that they believed was being created in the United States”.

The Strategic Hamlet Program also reflected wider ideas of American Exceptionalism. In their approach towards Vietnam, the US saw itself as a moderniser and an exemplary form of democracy. “The Strategic Hamlet Program projected a national identity for the US as a credible world power ready to meet revolutionary changes”. Perceptions of Vietnamese as "backwards" and subordinate to "Western Progress" resulted in the conclusion by US analysts that the Vietnamese were “incapable of self-government and vulnerable to foreign subversion".

The US media and government spokesmen presented the Strategic Hamlet Program and its projects of village relocation and social engineering as “reflections of benevolent American power”. In challenging communism against the backdrop of the Cold War, the Strategic Hamlet Program “revised older ideologies of imperialism and manifest destiny” stemming from notions of American Exceptionalism.

In aiming to deter the Vietnamese peoples from Communist and Vietcong influence, the US retained the “sense of national mission projected by an ideology of modernisation”. The US government aimed to defeat the threat of Communism in Vietnam to maintain its exceptionalist vision of “America's superior society and its transformative potential”. The adoption of modernisation theory “reflected a sense that the United States should be a universal model”.

The Program also had roots in Vietnamese policymaking. Diem's government had its own views of how to deal with the related issues of counter-insurgency and nation building, modern ideas which presented an alternative to the political agenda of both his regime's US ally and his Communist opponent. The Strategic Hamlet Program was, arguably, the clearest embodiment of these ideas. Although strategic hamlets aimed to separate the Communist-led guerrillas from the peasantry by regrouping and fortifying thousands of rural settlements, they were not merely a device to defeat the armed insurgency. Ngo Dinh Diem also saw them as a way of mobilizing the population politically and generating support for his regime; they were the centre-piece of the government's plans to modernize the RVN and simultaneously free it from dependence on the United States.

Ngo Dinh Diem made efforts to limit foreign involvement in the hamlet programme, particularly as the United States put a great deal of pressure on the regime in 1961 to accept US policy prescriptions for defeating the insurgents. Such demands further solidified notions within the Diem regime that its ally was overbearing and meddlesome; indeed, US pressure encouraged the Ngos to see the hamlet programme as a way to free South Vietnam from dependence on the United States for economic and military aid, as well as a way to satisfy their other political goals. Whilst the United States eventually supported the hamlet scheme, most US officials were 'somewhat bewildered by the sudden appearance of a major activity that had not been processed through their complex co-ordinating staffs'.

== Stages of the Strategic Hamlet Program ==
According to Thompson's memories, the Strategic Hamlet Program would be split into three stages: Clearing, holding and winning.

In the ‘clearing’ stage, areas for settlements were located which were usually next to an already secured area. These areas were then ‘saturated’ with police and military forces to either repel the insurgents or force them to depart to neighbouring territories, which could then also be ‘cleared’ for more settlements.

In the ‘holding’ stage, the government officials suggested that this would ‘restore government authority in the area and establish a firm security network.’ This was achieved by ensuring that military troops and police did not merely leave the hamlet once it had been cleared, so insurgents would not return at a late date.

The ‘winning’ stage involved the construction of schools, irrigation systems, new canals and road repairs to give the impression that the South Vietnamese government was working for the people's benefit in a ‘permanent capacity’. They also believed that educating the population into the modern world would counter communism, which many young men and women found appealing due to its ability to find ‘stable elements in their already unstable societies’. This was confirmed by W.W. Rostow on his trip to Saigon in October 1961, where he found that many young men were joining the Viet Cong in the hope of fitting into the modern world. But this survey was only conducted on a small sample size.

The stages of the program were designed to ultimately prevent communist re-infiltration.

However, this ‘clear and hold’ strategy came under some criticism from the U.S. Military Advisory Group who preferred the ‘search and destroy’ operations. This was due to the fact they had already trained the South Vietnamese to fight a conventional war which embraced counterinsurgency, so they preferred the fighting tactics used in Korea and World War One.

== Implementation ==
In late 1961, President Kennedy sent Roger Hilsman, then director of the State Department's Bureau of Intelligence and Research, to assess the situation in Vietnam. There Hilsman met Sir Robert Thompson, head of the British Advisory Mission to South Vietnam (BRIAM). Thompson was a veteran of the Malayan counter-insurgency effort and a counter-insurgency advisor to the Diem government. Thompson shared his revised system of resettlement and population security, a system he had proposed to Diem that would eventually become the Strategic Hamlet Program. Thompson's proposal, adopted by Diem, advocated a priority on winning control of the South Vietnamese rural population rather than killing insurgents. The police and local security forces would play an important role coupled with anti-insurgent sweeps by the South Vietnamese army (ARVN).

After his meetings with Thompson, on 2 February 1962 Hilsman described his concepts of a Strategic Hamlet Program in a policy document entitled "A Strategic Concept for South Vietnam", which President Kennedy read and endorsed. Hilsman proposed heavily fortified strategic hamlets. "Each strategic village will be protected by a ditch and a fence of barbed wire. It will include one or more observation towers...the area immediately around the village will be cleared for fields of fire and the area approaching the clearing, including the ditch, will be strewn with booby-traps...and other personal obstacles. The Strategic Hamlet Program "aimed to condense South Vietnam’s roughly 16 000 hamlets (each estimated to have a population of slightly less than 1000) into about 12000 strategic hamlets”.

Hilsman proposed that each strategic hamlet be protected by a self-defense group of 75 to 100 armed men. The self-defense group would, in addition to defending the hamlet, be responsible for "enforcing curfews, checking identity cards, and ferreting out hard-core Communists." The objective was to separate, physically and politically, the Viet Cong guerrillas and supporters from the rural population.

The first step in the establishment of a strategic hamlet would be a census carried out by the South Vietnamese government. Next, villagers would be required to build fortifications and the members of the self-defense force identified and trained. The villagers would be registered and be given identity cards, and their movements would be monitored. Outside the fortifications would be a free-fire zone.

The South Vietnamese government on its part would provide assistance to the strategic hamlet and build an "essential socio-political base" that would break old habits and orient the residents toward identification with the country of South Vietnam.

President Diem in an April 1962 speech outlined his hopes for the Program:

... strategic hamlets represented the basic elements in the war undertaken by our people against our three enemies: communism, discord, and underdevelopment. In this concept they also represent foundation of the Vietnamese society where values are reassessed according to the personalist revolution where social, cultural, and economic reform will improve the living conditions of the large working class down to the remotest village.

The U.S. military commander in Vietnam, General Lionel C. McGarr, was initially skeptical of the Strategic Hamlet Program, especially because it emphasized police and local security forces rather than military action against insurgents. The U.S. military also objected to the proposed focus of the program on the most populated areas of South Vietnam; the U.S. wished to focus on areas where communist influence was greatest. After compromises were made to secure U.S. agreement, the Strategic Hamlet Program began implementation in March 1962.

== Life in the Strategic Hamlet ==
As George Kahin suggests, life in the strategic hamlets was about more than fighting communism, it underpinned ‘a deeper globalisation problem within Cold War politics’; imperialism.

In the hamlets, the peasants were subjected to social control including constant surveillance from troops and watchtowers, identification cards needing to be carried by peasants at all times, and permission being needed to travel beyond the confines of the hamlet.

From the 1950s onwards, Non-government organisations (NGOs), or Civic action groups like the Peace Corps, were called into Vietnam, including in the hamlets, to help build infrastructure like dams and public roads. Kennedy believed that the provision of livestock, cooking oil and fertiliser alongside the establishment of local elections and community projects would give peasants a ‘stake in the war’.

A key strategy for hamlet residents was the U.S. 'self-help' projects. These projects would increase the connections between officials and the peasantry to create loyalty to Diem's regime. According to Hilsman, giving the hamlet people a ‘choice’ on which projects would most benefit their hamlet community would earn ‘an enormous political gain’ to counter the NLF's portrayal of the U.S. as an imperial power. But, as former USOM official stated, whilst the projects undertaken were supposed to be decided by the hamlet people in local meetings, it was often the case that high-profile officials working within the hamlets decided on such projects. There was 62 projects made in 1964, with expansions expected in 1965, but as Latham suggests, ‘U.S. policies ignored the contradiction between the promotion of freedom and the construction of forced labour camps.’

Building schools and educating the peasants were also encouraged in the hamlets as the U.S. felt that education would instil new political values which would create a new cultural perspective for the Vietnamese population. This links to American interventionism, which suggested that intervening in foreign relations would preserve American values and maintain Western security.

Hence non-state actors played a role in the programs' implementation. Aid workers from the United States Operations Mission oversaw hamlet school construction and teacher-training programs. IVS education volunteers provided grassroots-level assistance to Vietnamese instructors and served as teachers in the strategic hamlets. As Elkind writes, the volunteers primary mission in the hamlets was to inspire a “desire for education” among the local population. They strove to accomplish this goal through “the mental conditioning of villagers to accept change and development.” Elkind also wrote that the volunteers’ had a disregard for the negative consequences of the program in the people forced to move to the hamlets and that this ultimately contributed to a widespread belief among the Vietnamese people that neither the South Vietnamese government nor its American supporters had their best interests in mind. Elkind wrote that their vision of helping Vietnam's people was incompatible with the counterinsurgency goals of the strategic hamlet program.

== Operation Sunrise ==
Operation Sunrise began on 19 March 1962 in Bình Dương Province, bordering the city of Saigon on the North. The province was heavily influenced by the Viet Cong, especially in the Iron Triangle, a Viet Cong stronghold. The selection of Binh Duong was contrary to Thompson's advice to choose a more secure area for the initial phase of the Strategic Hamlet Program. The United States Agency for International Development provided $21 per family to compensate farmers for their loss of property when forced to move into a strategic hamlet. Of the first 210 families relocated, 140 were reported to have been moved at gunpoint. South Vietnamese soldiers burned their former villages. By May, South Vietnam's government-owned newspaper reported that only 7 percent of 38,000 rural dwellers in the target area had been relocated either voluntarily or by force.

== Problems ==
Although many people in both the U.S. government and government of South Vietnam (GVN) agreed that the Strategic Hamlet Program was strong in theory, its actual implementation was deficient on several grounds. Roger Hilsman himself later claimed that the GVN's execution of program constituted a "total misunderstanding of what the [Strategic Hamlet] program should try to do."

The speed of the implementation of the Program was one of the main causes for its eventual failure. The Pentagon Papers reported that in September 1962, 4.3 million people were housed in 3,225 completed hamlets with more than two thousand still under construction. By July 1963, over eight and a half million people had been settled in 7,205 hamlets according to figures given by the Vietnam Press. In less than a year, both the number of completed hamlets and its population had doubled. Given this rapid rate of construction, the GVN was unable to fully support or protect the hamlets or its residents, despite funding by the United States government. Viet Cong insurgents easily sabotaged and overran the poorly defended communities, gaining access to the South Vietnamese peasants. Only twenty percent of the hamlets in the Mekong Delta area were controlled by the GVN by the end of 1963. In an interview, a resident of a hamlet in Vinh-Long described the situation: "It is dangerous in my village because the civil guard from the district headquarters cross the river to the village only in the daytime…leaving the village unprotected at night. The village people have no protection from the Viet Cong so they will not inform on them to the authorities."

Alongside the execution and intimidation of hamlet officials, the Viet Cong opposition to the Strategic Hamlet program included a fierce propaganda campaign, which portrayed U.S. strategy in Vietnam as imperialism. When Robert Thompson sent Filipino field operatives into local hamlet settlements, they reported that South Vietnamese peasants accepted Viet Cong propaganda as they believed that ‘America had replaced France as a colonial power in Vietnam’.

The U.S. officials tried to counter Viet Cong propaganda with their own, which included hiring Asian operatives in provinces, particularly Filipino. In theory, this would convince the South Vietnamese of the purpose of American assistance through their shared ethnicity, or ‘indigenous nationalism.’ This became known as the ‘demonstration effect’ as Filipinos were deemed a prime example of a country which had been ‘modelled on the enlightenment and benevolence of American tutelage.’

Another propaganda technique was using the forced relocations to inform South Vietnamese peasants that if they supported the North, then they would allow them to return home once the communist revolution had been won.

The Viet Cong also escalated their recruitment program by using women. This was not only through presenting women as victims by drawing on Vietnamese atrocities such as the rape of women, but Northern officials believed that women were the ideal political and psychological weapon for infiltration within the Strategic Hamlets. Their usefulness as operatives was underpinned by the fact that Northern officials thought that the U.S. government would not suspect women of being Communist allies. Although the U.S. also attempted to mobilise women, namely the Women’s Solidarity Movement, which Thompson believed could be trained alongside the Republican Youth Movement to protect the hamlets if they needed, this was unsuccessful. Not only were the members upper class and educated women, therefore not representative of the Vietnamese peasant population, but the founder; Madame Nhu, eventually instructed the Movement to oppose U.S. intervention strategies.

There are several other important problems that the GVN faced in addition to those created by the failure to provide basic social needs for the peasants and over-extension of its resources. One of these was wide public opposition to the Program stemming partly from the inability of the committee to choose safe and agriculturally sound locations for the hamlets. However, according to the Pentagon Papers, the most important source of failure was the inflexible nature of the ruling Ngo family.

In 1962, Ngô Đình Nhu, President Diem's brother, headed the Strategic Hamlet Program, attempting to build fortified villages that would provide security for rural Vietnamese. The objective was to lock the Viet Cong out so that they could not operate among the villagers. Colonel Phạm Ngọc Thảo supervised these efforts, and when told that the peasants resented being forcibly removed from their ancestral lands and put into forts they were compelled to build, he advised Nhu it was imperative to build as many hamlets as fast as possible. The Ngôs were unaware Thảo, ostensibly a Catholic, was in fact a communist double agent acting to turn the rural populace against Saigon. Thảo helped to ruin Nhu's scheme by having strategic hamlets built in communist strongholds. This increased the number of communist sympathizers who were placed inside the hamlets and given identification cards. As a result, the Viet Cong were able to more effectively penetrate the villages to access supplies and personnel.

=== Forced relocation ===
In the best case scenario, restructuring peasant villages to create a defensible perimeter would require the forced relocation of some of the peasants on the outskirts of the existing villages. To ease the burden, those forced to move were supposed to be financially compensated, but they were not always paid by the GVN forces. Sometimes relocated villagers had their old homes burnt. This occurred during Operation Sunrise. Some relocated people also had to build new homes with their own labor and at their own expense. There was also the compulsory labor the South Vietnamese government forced on relocated peasants, leading Noam Chomsky to compare the hamlets to "virtual concentration camps."

President Diem and his brother Nhu, who oversaw the program, decided – contrary to Hilsman's and Thompson's theory – that in most cases they would relocate entire villages rather than simply restructuring them. This decision led to large-scale forced relocation that was deeply unpopular among the peasantry. The mostly-Buddhist peasantry practiced ancestor worship, an important part of their religion that was disrupted by being forced out of their villages and away from their ancestors' graves and their ancestral homes. Some who resisted resettlement were summarily executed by GVN forces.

=== Corruption ===
Promised compensation for resettled peasants was not always forthcoming and instead found its way in the pockets of South Vietnamese government officials. Peasants were promised wages for their labor building the new villages and fortifications; some corrupt officials kept the money for themselves. Wealthier peasants sometimes bribed their way out of working on construction, leaving more labor for the poorer peasants. Although the U.S. provided materials like sheet metal and barbed wire, corrupt officials sometimes forced the locals to buy the materials intended to provide them with protection.

=== Security shortcomings ===
Perhaps the greatest shortcoming of the Strategic Hamlet Program was its failure to provide the basic security envisioned by its proponents. This failure was partly due to poor placement of the hamlets. Ignoring the "oil-blot" principle (establish first in secure areas, then spread out), the South Vietnamese government began building strategic hamlets as quickly as possible and seemingly without considering "geographical priorities," according to a U.S. official. The randomly placed hamlets were isolated, not mutually supporting, and tempting targets for the Vietcong.

Each hamlet was given a radio with which to call for South Vietnamese army ARVN support, but in fact ARVN forces were unreliable in responding to calls for help, especially when attacks occurred after nightfall. The villagers were also given weapons and training, but were only expected to hold out until conventional reinforcements arrived. Once it became clear that ARVN could not be relied upon, many villagers proved unwilling to fight even small Vietcong detachments, which could then capture the villagers' weapons. "Why should we die for weapons?" asked one Vietnamese peasant.

== Failure ==
Despite the Diem government's attempt to put a positive spin on the Strategic Hamlet Program, by mid-1963 it was clear to many that the program was failing. American military advisors such as John Paul Vann criticized the program in their official reports. They also expressed concerns to reporters who began to investigate more closely. David Halberstam's coverage of the Strategic Hamlet Program's shortcomings caught the eye of President Kennedy.

The Strategic Hamlet Program was exposed as an almost complete failure in the aftermath of the November 1, 1963 coup that left Diem and his brother Nhu murdered. US officials discovered, for example, that only 20% of the 8600 hamlets that the Diem regime had reported "Complete" met the minimum American standards of security and readiness. The situation had passed the point of possible recovery. The program officially ended in 1964.

On the ground in Vietnam, the demise of the program was visible. By the end of 1963, empty hamlets lined country roads, stripped of valuable metal by the Vietcong and the fleeing peasants. According to Neil Sheehan, "The rows of roofless houses looked like villages of play huts that children had erected and then whimsically abandoned."

In his book Vietnam: a History (Viking,1983) Stanley Karnow describes his observations:

In the last week of November . . I drove south from Saigon into Long An, a province in the Mekong Delta, the rice basket of South Vietnam where 40 per cent of the population lived.
There I found the strategic hamlet program begun during the Diem regime in shambles.
At a place called Hoa Phu, the strategic hamlet built during the previous summer now looked like it had been hit by a hurricane. The barbed wire fence around the enclosure had been ripped apart, the watchtowers were demolished and only a few of its original thousand residents remained, sheltered in lean-tos... A local guard explained to me that a handful of Vietcong agents had entered the hamlet one night and told the peasants to tear it down and return to their native villages. The peasants complied...
From the start, in Hoa Phu and elsewhere, they had hated the strategic hamlets, many of which they had been forced to construct by corrupt officials who had pocketed a percentage of the money allocated for the projects. Besides, there were virtually no government troops in the sector to keep them from leaving. If the war was a battle for "hearts and minds,"...the United States and its South Vietnamese clients had certainly lost Long An.
My cursory impression, I later discovered, was confirmed in a more extensive survey conducted by Earl Young, the senior U. S. representative in the province. He reported in early December that three quarters of the two hundred strategic hamlets in Long An had been destroyed since the summer, either by the Vietcong or by their own occupants, or by a combination of both.

Years later Roger Hilsman stated his belief that the strategic hamlet concept was executed so poorly by the Diem regime and the GVN "that it was useless."

== See also ==
- Briggs Plan
- Carceral archipelago
- Combined Action Program
- Counter-insurgency
- New village
- Operation Ranch Hand
- Population transfer
- Villagization
