= Robert Grainger Ker Thompson =

British military officer and counter-insurgency expert

Robert G. K. Thompson
- Born: 12 April 1916
- Died: 16 May 1992 (aged 76)
- Military career
- Branch: Royal Air Force
- Conflicts: Burma Campaign during World War II; Malayan Emergency
- Awards: Order of the British Empire (KBE); Order of St Michael and St George (CMG); Distinguished Service Order (DSO); Military Cross (MC)

Sir Robert Grainger Ker Thompson KBE CMG DSO MC (12 April 1916 – 16 May 1992) was a British military officer and counter-insurgency expert who "was widely regarded on both sides of the Atlantic as the world's leading expert on countering the Mao Tse-tung technique of rural guerrilla insurgency". His 1966 book Defeating Communist Insurgency played an important role in popularizing the "hearts and minds" approach to counterinsurgency.

== Biography ==
Thompson was the son of Canon W. G. Thompson. He went to Marlborough College and took an MA at Sidney Sussex College, Cambridge. While at Cambridge, he joined the University Air Squadron learning to fly. He was commissioned into the Royal Air Force Reserve in 1936. In 1938, he joined the Malayan Civil Service as a cadet.

At the start of World War II, Thomson joined the RAF, and was serving in Macao when the Japanese attacked. He escaped the Japanese and with a suitcase full of money and a knowledge of Cantonese, he gambled his way across China to Burma.

He was a liaison officer with the Chindits in the Burma Campaign, being awarded the Distinguished Service Order and the Military Cross (the latter an unusual decoration for an RAF officer, since it is normally awarded to those serving in the British Army). Later in the campaign, he flew Hurricanes and was promoted to the rank of Squadron Leader in 1945.

At the war's end, he returned to the Malayan civil service, becoming assistant commissioner of labour in the state of Perak in 1946. After attending the Joint Services Staff College at Latimer and holding the local rank of lieutenant-colonel, he was a member of the staff of the British director of operations during the Malayan Emergency. He would later say that much of what he had learned about counter-insurgency operations was learned while serving under Lieutenant-General Sir Harold Briggs and his replacement, General Sir Gerald Templer.

In 1959, (after Malayan independence), Thompson became permanent secretary for defence for Tun Abdul Razak (who later became Malayan prime minister). In response to a request from President Ngo Dinh Diem of South Vietnam, Tunku Abdul Rahman, the Malayan prime minister sent a team to South Vietnam to advise Diem on how to counter his insurgency problems. Thompson headed that team which so impressed Diem that he asked the British to second Thompson to the government South Vietnam as an advisor.

In September 1961, the British Prime Minister Harold Macmillan appointed Thompson head of the newly established BRIAM (British Advisory Mission to South Vietnam) and - by extension - to Washington. Thompson conceived of an initiative he called the Delta Plan, but when he saw the effects of the strategic hamlets initiative, begun in February 1962, he became an enthusiastic backer, telling President Kennedy in 1963 that he felt the war could be won. Under Thompson's leadership, BRIAM put economic pressure on the South Vietnamese government that Thompson described as a "straight invitation to a coup".

Kennedy was receptive to Thompson's ideas, but the American military establishment were extremely reluctant to implement them. His warning not to bomb villages went unheeded and his dismissal of American air supremacy was ignored. "The war [will] be won by brains and on foot", he told Kennedy, but competing interests in Washington and Saigon acted to marginalise Thompson and ultimately his strategies had no real effect on the conflict. He stepped down from BRIAM in 1965 and the organisation, deprived of the man who was essentially its raison d'être, folded up around him.

Thompson subsequently worked as a consultant for the Rand Corporation. Despite his relatively acrimonious criticism of United States policy in Vietnam, Thompson returned to a post assisting the American government in November 1969 when he became a special adviser on "pacification" to President Nixon. Following a visit to South Vietnam. Thompson advised Nixon that the South Vietnamese government was winning the war and would continue to do so unless Vietnamization proceeded too quickly.

In later life, Thompson wrote extensively about the use of commandos and counter-insurgency operations in asymmetric warfare.

== Defeating Communist Insurgency: Experiences in Malaysia and Vietnam ==
Certain basic principles of counter-insurgency warfare have been well known since the 1950s and 1960s. The widely distributed and influential work of Sir Robert Thompson offers several such guidelines. Thompson's underlying assumption is that of a country minimally committed to the rule of law and better governance.

Elements of Thompson's moderate approach are adapted here:

1. The people are the key base to be secured and defended rather than territory won or enemy bodies counted. Contrary to the focus of conventional warfare, territory gained or casualty counts are not of overriding importance in counter-guerrilla warfare. The support of the population is the key variable. Since many insurgents rely on the population for recruits, food, shelter, financing, and other materials, the counter-insurgent force must focus its efforts on providing physical and economic security for that population and defending it against insurgent attacks and propaganda.
2. There must be a clear political counter-vision that can overshadow, match or neutralize the guerrilla vision. This can range from granting political autonomy to economic development measures in the affected region. The vision must be an integrated approach, involving political, social and economic and media influence measures. A nationalist narrative, for example, might be used in one situation, an ethnic autonomy approach in another. An aggressive media campaign must also be mounted in support of the competing vision or the counter-insurgent regime will appear weak or incompetent.
3. Practical action must be taken at the lower levels to match the competitive political vision. It may be tempting for the counter-insurgent side simply to declare guerrillas "terrorists" and pursue a harsh liquidation strategy. Brute force, however, may not be successful in the long run. Action does not mean capitulation, but sincere steps such as removing corrupt or arbitrary officials, cleaning up fraud, building more infrastructure, collecting taxes honestly, or addressing other legitimate grievances can do much to undermine the guerrillas' appeal.
4. Economy of force. The counter-insurgent regime must not overreact to guerrilla provocations, since this may indeed be what they seek in order to create a crisis in civilian morale. Indiscriminate use of firepower may only serve to alienate the key focus of counter-insurgency - the base of the people. Police level actions should guide the effort and take place in a clear framework of legality, even if under a State of Emergency. Civil liberties and other customs of peacetime may have to be suspended, but again, the counter-insurgent regime must exercise restraint, and cleave to orderly procedures. In the counter-insurgency context, "boots on the ground" are even more important than technological prowess and massive firepower, although anti-guerrilla forces should take full advantage of modern air, artillery and electronic warfare assets.
5. Big unit action may sometimes be necessary. If police action is not sufficient to stop the guerrilla fighters, military sweeps may be necessary. Such "big battalion" operations may be needed to break up significant guerrilla concentrations and split them into small groups where combined civic-police action can control them.
6. Aggressive mobility. Mobility and aggressive small unit action is extremely important for the counter-insurgent regime. Heavy formations must be lightened aggressively to locate, pursue and neutralise insurgent units. Huddling in static strongpoints simply concedes the field to the insurgents. They must be kept on the run constantly with aggressive patrols, raids, ambushes, sweeps, cordons, roadblocks, prisoner snatches, etc.
7. Ground level embedding and integration. In tandem with mobility is the embedding of hardcore counter-insurgent units or troops with local security forces and civilian elements. The US Marines in Vietnam also saw some success with this method, under its CAP (Combined Action Program) where Marines were teamed as both trainers and "stiffeners" of local elements on the ground. US Special Forces in Vietnam, like the Green Berets, also caused significant local problems for their opponents by their leadership and integration with mobile tribal and irregular forces. The CIA's Special Activities Division created successful guerrilla forces from the Hmong tribe during the war in Vietnam in the 1960s, from the Northern Alliance against the Taliban during the war in Afghanistan in 2001, and from the Kurdish Peshmerga against Ansar al-Islam and the forces of Saddam Hussein during the war in Iraq in 2003. In Iraq, the 2007 US "surge" strategy saw the embedding of regular and special forces troops among Iraqi army units. These hardcore groups were also incorporated into local neighborhood outposts in a bid to facilitate intelligence gathering, and to strengthen ground level support among the masses.
8. Cultural sensitivity. Counter-insurgent forces require familiarity with the local culture, mores and language or they will experience numerous difficulties. Americans experienced this in Vietnam and during the US invasion of Iraqi and occupation, where shortages of Arabic speaking interpreters and translators hindered both civil and military operations.
9. Systematic intelligence effort. Every effort must be made to gather and organize useful intelligence. A systematic process must be set up to do so, from casual questioning of civilians to structured interrogations of prisoners. Creative measures must also be used, including the use of double agents, or even bogus "liberation" or sympathizer groups that help reveal insurgent personnel or operations.
10. Methodical clear and hold. An "ink spot" clear and hold strategy must be used by the counter-insurgent regime, dividing the conflict area into sectors, and assigning priorities between them. Control must expand outward like an ink spot on paper, systematically neutralizing and eliminating the insurgents in one sector of the grid, before proceeding to the next. It may be necessary to pursue holding or defensive actions elsewhere, while priority areas are cleared and held.
11. Careful deployment of mass popular forces and special units. Mass forces include village self-defense groups and citizen militias organized for community defense and can be useful in providing civic mobilization and local security. Specialist units can be used profitably, including commando squads, long range reconnaissance and "hunter-killer" patrols, defectors who can track or persuade their former colleagues like the Kit Carson units in Vietnam, and paramilitary style groups.
12. The limits of foreign assistance must be clearly defined and carefully used. Such aid should be limited either by time, or as to material and technical, and personnel support, or both. While outside aid or even troops can be helpful, lack of clear limits, in terms of either a realistic plan for victory or exit strategy, may find the foreign helper "taking over" the local war, and being sucked into a lengthy commitment, thus providing the guerrillas with valuable propaganda opportunities as the toll of dead foreigners mounts. Such a scenario occurred with the US in Vietnam, with the American effort creating dependence in South Vietnam, and war-weariness and protests back home. Heavy-handed foreign interference may also fail to operate effectively within the local cultural context, setting up conditions for failure.
13. Time. A key factor in guerrilla strategy is a drawn-out, protracted conflict that wears down the will of the opposing counter-insurgent forces. Democracies are especially vulnerable to the factor of time. The counter-insurgent force must allow enough time to get the job done. Impatient demands for victory centered around short-term electoral cycles play into the hands of the guerrillas, though it is equally important to recognize when a cause is lost and the guerrillas have won.

== Published works ==
- Judgement on Major General O C Wingate, DSO, written on behalf of the Chindits Old Comrades Association in collaboration with Brigadier P. W. Mead (Liddell Hart Centre for Military Archives)
- Defeating Communist Insurgency: Experiences in Malaya and Vietnam (Study in International Security), Chatto & Windus, 1966, ISBN 0-7011-1133-X. (Extracts of this book was distributed by the Calcutta chief of police to Bengali police men in December 1970 during the naxalite insurgency in Calcutta).
- Defeating communist insurgency : experiences from Malaya and Vietnam, 1966
- "America fights the wrong war", The Spectator, 12 August 1966
- Royal Flying Corps (Famous Regts. S), L Cooper, 1968, ISBN 0-85052-010-X
- "Squaring the Error" in Foreign Affairs April 1968. (An issue with 4 articles on Vietnam the other three authors were by Roger Hilsman, Chester L. Cooper and Hamilton Fish Armstrong).
- No Exit From Vietnam, David McKay company, Inc., New York, 1969, ISBN 0-7011-1494-0
- Interviewed by Frank Reynolds on ABC-TV 17 December 1969
- Revolutionary war in world strategy, 1945-1969 First Edition (U.K.), London: Martin Secker & Warburg, 1970, ISBN 0-4365-2051-6
- Peace Is Not At Hand , New York: David McKay, London: Chatto and Windus, 1974, ISBN 0-7011-2057-6
- "Rear Bases and Sanctuaries" in Lessons of Vietnam, editors Thompson, W. Scott and Donaldson D. Frizzell, Pub Taylor & Francis, Incorporated, 1977
- War in Peace: An Analysis of Warfare Since 1945, (consultant editor) 1981, Orbis Publishing Limited, London, ISBN 0-85613-341-8
- Make for the Hills, an autobiography, London, Pen & Sword Books/Leo Cooper, 1989, ISBN 0-85052-761-9

== Honour ==
=== Honour of Malaya ===
- Malaya : Companion of the Order of the Defender of the Realm (J.M.N.) (1958)
